= Joule Assets =

Joule Assets, Inc.
- Type: Incorporation
- Industry: Energy, Software and Financing
- Founded: 2010
- Founder: Mike Gordon and Dennis Quinn
- Headquarters: Bedford Hills, NY, United States
- Website: http://jouleassets.com

Joule Assets is a provider of energy reduction market analysis, tools and financing. Joule Assets creates Energy Reduction Assets by accessing value from reduction measures such as demand response, energy efficiency, and energy storage.

Joule Assets, Inc. develops energy reduction asset software and acts as a financing source for energy consumers, producers, and distributors, as well as energy reduction services, hardware, and software companies. It offers energy efficiency services that include energy efficiency auction products, which are built to fill market gaps to create contract opportunities for market players; and energy efficiency pro forma products, which allows licensees to intuitively estimate the value of environmental attributes, such as CERs, white certificates, and demand reduction for a project. The company also provides clean generation auction products and clean generation pro-forma worksheets products.

== History ==
Joule Assets was founded in 2010 by Demand Response industry leaders Mike Gordon, CEO, and Dennis Quinn, COO. Gordon previously served as founder and CEO of Consumer Powerline (later CPower, a DR aggregator, later purchased by Constellation Energy Group.

Quinn, a founding member and previous CEO of Celerity Energy, was instrumental in developing the early demand response rules for participation in California. Celerity Energy was sold to EnerNoc in 2006.

Gordon and Quinn brought some of the first commercial and multifamily buildings into Demand Response markets, and signed 100,000 Service Classification 8 units in over 300 master-metered buildings in New York City.

== Services ==
Joule Assets also offers an investment fund to allow businesses to install load controls or do retrofits that will, in turn, help them tap into additional market opportunities. Customers/partners include energy and curtailment service providers, grid operators, equipment companies, ESCOs, and software.

Joule Assets developed a web-based software platform designed to identify local and available demand response and energy reduction opportunities for commercial and industrial customers to turn energy savings into value streams.

The Energy Reduction Asset (ERA) platform is a searchable database tool for firms to easily engage in energy reduction programs through the local utility/independent systems operator for cost benefits. The ERA platform includes meter and benchmarked data for those needing guidance in fine tuning a facility’s curtailment capability as well as a critical peak pricing(CPP) tariff calculator that will help users understand whether CPP is right for them.

== See also ==
- ESCO
- Demand Response
- Energy efficient use
- Energy efficiency implementation
- Constellation Energy
- EnerNOC
- Energy Reduction Assets
- Peak demand
- Energy demand management
