= EFA =

EFA may refer to:

== Arts ==
- European Film Academy, a trade organisation
- European Film Awards, organized by the European Film Academy
- European Festivals Association, an arts festival organisation

== Commerce ==
- Electricity Forward Agreement, on the electricity market
- European Finance Association
- Expedited Funds Availability Act, of the United States Congress
- IShares MSCI EAFE, an exchange-traded fund

== Education ==
- French School at Athens (French: École française d'Athènes)
- Education Funding Agency, now part of the Education and Skills Funding Agency of the Government of the United Kingdom
- Elmira Free Academy, a high school in upstate New York
- Education For All, an initiative of UNESCO
- Escuelas Familiares Agrarias (Agricultural Training Schools)

== Military ==
- EFA (mobile bridge), used by the French military
- European Fighter Aircraft, now the Eurofighter Typhoon

== Science and technology ==
- Elementary function arithmetic
- Essential fatty acid
- Exploratory factor analysis

== Sport ==
- Egyptian Football Association
- Eswatini Football Association
- Eton Fives Association, the governing body for Eton Fives in England
- European Football Alliance

== Other uses ==
- Efai language
- Electronic Frontiers Australia, an Australian privacy organization
- Endometriosis Foundation of America
- Environmental Foundation for Africa, an African environmental organization
- Euro First Air - Canarias Cargo, a defunct Spanish airline
- European Free Alliance, a European political coalition
- Express Freighters Australia, an Australian airline
- Eyes For Africa Charity, a medical charity
