= Grid friendly =

Descriptor for responsive electrical devices

Electrical devices are considered grid friendly if they operate in a manner that supports electrical grid reliability through demand response. Basic grid-friendly devices may incorporate features that work to offset short-term undesirable changes in line frequency or voltage; more sophisticated devices may alter their operating profile based on the current market price for electricity, reducing load when prices are at a peak. Grid-friendly devices can include major appliances found in homes, commercial building systems such as HVAC, and many industrial systems.

== Frequency Response ==
Most electric systems use alternating current with a nominal frequency of 50 or 60 Hz (hertz) to deliver energy produced by electrical generators to the electricity consumers. When the amount of electric power produced by the generators exceeds the power used by the customers, the frequency of the electricity rises. Conversely, when the amount of electric power produced is less than what is consumed, the frequency drops. Therefore frequency is an accurate indicator of the system-wide (called global) balance between supply and demand. Without grid-friendly frequency response, the rate at which the frequency changes is dependent principally on the system's total inertia (which is not very controllable) and the aggregate response of the generators' control systems (which can only be controlled relatively slowly). In contrast, grid-friendly devices can act very quickly.

A grid-friendly device can respond to changes in frequency by reducing or interrupting the demand for electric power (called load) when the frequency drops below a certain threshold, and/or increasing load when the frequency rises. Although a single grid-friendly device may be a very small load, the fraction of the total load that can be controlled by frequency at any time is usually sufficient to provide under-frequency protection to the system before more drastic measures like black-outs are required.

The advantage of grid-friendly frequency response is that frequency is ubiquitous on an electric system. When a generator shuts down in one part of the system, all the loads everywhere in the system can simultaneously detect the change and respond instantly and appropriately without the need for a control system to detect the problem, a control center to make a decision, or a telecommunications network to deliver commands to millions of devices. This type of behavior changes frequency from a simple electrodynamic and control systems input to an emergent property. While there is still some controversy on the subject, it is believed that complex systems utilizing self-regulation through emergence are generally more resilient and flexible than are simpler top-down command and control systems.

== Voltage Response ==
In contrast to frequency, voltage varies widely throughout electric systems, because it is the voltage difference between two devices that largely determines the direction and magnitude of the current (hence the power) that flows between them. Therefore voltage is a more local phenomenon, and grid-friendly devices that respond to voltage will support more local aspects of the electric delivery system. However, load types such as thermally protected induction motors and power electronics can respond poorly to significant voltage changes. When a sufficient fraction of the power demand in a region is composed of such loads, their collective response can lead to fault-induced delayed voltage recovery behavior, which may have adverse effects on transmission system reliability and may require mitigation to avoid initiating system outages.

== Price Response ==
While frequency and voltage respond to physical phenomena on the electric system, grid-friendly price response is designed to address economic phenomena. With the increasing application of electricity markets to manage the efficient distribution of electric power, more consumers are exposed to electricity prices that change over time, rather than fixed for months or years. In general, higher prices occur at times when the electric system is running short of supply. The purpose of grid-friendly price response is to promote demand response among electricity consumers. Demand response is one means of reducing the market power of electricity suppliers when production runs short. Grid-friendly response to price also allows consumers to reduce their energy costs by using less electricity when prices are high, and more electricity when prices are low.

== Demonstrated Results ==
A demonstration of grid-friendly technology was conducted for the United States Department of Energy in 2006 and 2007 in the Northwest region of the United States. Participants included local utilities, residential and commercial customers, industrial loads belonging to municipalities, and a number of vendors and researchers. The grid-friendly technology demonstration showed that common residential appliances did automatically detect grid problems expressed as frequency deviations and reduced energy consumption at critical moments. The Olympic Peninsula demonstration showed that residential, commercial, and industrial loads did adjust their consumption patterns based on price signals emanating from a distribution-level market operated as a double auction. Both of these projects showed how grid-friendly technologies can and do reduce pressure on the electric grid during time of peak demand.

== See also ==
- Dynamic demand
- Energy demand management
- GridLAB-D

== Sources and additional resources ==
- US Department of Energy, Office of Electricity Delivery and Energy Reliability
- Grigsby, L. L., et al. The Electric Power Engineering Handbook. USA: CRC Press. (2001). ISBN 0-8493-8578-4
- S. Stoft. Power System Economics. Wiley Interscience. IEEE Press. (2002). ISBN 0-471-15040-1
- D. J. Morrow, et al. (1991). Low-cost under-frequency relay for distributed load-shedding. In proc. of 3rd Int. Conf. on Power System Monitoring and Control. 273-275.
- Z. Zhang, et al. (1999). An adaptive microcomputer-based load shedding relay. In conf. rec. of 34th IAS Annual Mtg. Industrial Applications. 3: 2065–2071.
- D. P. Chassin, et al. (2005). Estimation of WECC system inertia using observed frequency transients. IEEE Transactions on Power Systems. 20:2 1190–1192.
- Pacific Northwest National Laboratory (2007). GridWise Demonstration Project Fast Facts. .
- D. Hammerstrom et al. (2007). Pacific Northwest GridWise Testbed Demonstration Projects Part II. Grid Friendly Appliance Project. PNNL no. 17079, Pacific Northwest National Laboratory, Richland, Washington.
- D. Hammerstrom et al. (2007). Pacific Northwest GridWise Testbed Demonstration Projects Part I. Olympic Peninsula Project. PNNL no. 17167, Pacific Northwest National Laboratory, Richland, Washington.
