= EMotorWerks =

eMotorWerks
- Type: Subsidiary
- Industry: Electric vehicle infrastructure
- Founded: 2010; 16 years ago
- Headquarters: San Carlos, California
- Key people: Val Miftakhov, CEO
- Products: Electric vehicle Charging stations, Demand response
- Revenue: US$3.9 Million (2016)
- Parent: Enel
- Website: emotorwerks.com

eMotorWerks, an Enel Group Company, is an electric vehicle infrastructure company, based in San Carlos, California. eMotorWerks was founded in 2010 by Val Miftakhov, who was also its CEO until it merged with Enel X. eMotorWerks was acquired by Enel through its EnerNOC, and is part of the Enel X group.

== History ==
=== eMotorWerks Modular Mechanical Conversion System ===
The company started as a developer of Electric Vehicle conversion kits in 2010, and by 2012 had a product. The Modular Mechanical Conversion System was designed "to hold all the EV components and attach them to the donor vehicle. The system is adaptable with minor modifications to many types of passenger vehicles."

=== JuiceBox EVSE ===
eMotorWerks started development of its JuiceBox as a DIY kit, funding it via Kickstarter in 2013.

== JuiceNet ==
JuiceNet enabled Charging stations pay the user back in average EV driver $133/year for consuming cleaner (and cheaper) electricity. "the average EV owner returning about that amount over 3 years.

== Awards ==
- 2018 Global Cleantech 100
- 2018 Silver Edison Awards on Energy & Sustainability, Vehicle Advancements
- 2017 Inc. (magazine) America's 500 highest growth companies
- 2017 Grid Edge Awards
- 2016 Energy Productivity Innovation Challenge (EPIC) Award at the World Business Council for Sustainable Development (WBCSD) side event at the UN Climate Summit

== 2024 Enel X Way Shut Down in North America ==
At the end of 2024, Enel X Way shut down its EV charging operations in North America, discontinuing support for its JuiceBox residential and commercial chargers. The move left over 100,000 JuiceBox units without backend connectivity, affecting cities, universities, businesses, multifamily properties, and residential users. In response, independent software providers began facilitating large-scale migrations to restore remote monitoring, reporting, and access control for commercial and public site hosts. As of mid-2025, no alternative software has been made available for residential JuiceBox users.

Following a bankruptcy auction process, VoltiE Group acquired Enel X Way’s North American assets, including the JuiceBox line of EV chargers, following Enel X Way USA's closure on October 11, 2024. With this acquisition, VoltiE Group aims to incorporate the product into its operations while expanding its EV charging infrastructure across North America. Headquartered in Miramar, Florida, the company plans to leverage its existing technology to support the growing demand for EV charging. VoltiE was in the process of migrating EV chargers to its next-generation charging platform, with the JuiceBox network set to remain operational until the end of April 2025. After this date, chargers needed to transition to VoltiE’s network to continue functioning. The company introduced infrastructure upgrades, including real-time diagnostics, enhanced security features, and a distributed network to improve reliability. Additionally, VoltiE became the sole authorized provider of software for JuiceBox chargers, warning users against unauthorized modifications that could impact functionality and security. Commercial partners were encouraged to complete the migration before the JuiceBox-hosted platform was decommissioned to ensure uninterrupted service.

== See also ==
- Charging station
- Plug-in vehicle
- Plug-in hybrid vehicle
