= JuiceNet =

JuiceNet may refer to:

- eMotorWerks' Internet of Things (IoT) platform for the smart management of EV charging
- H_{2}O: Just Add Water
