= Milano Monza Open-Air Motor Show =

- Status: Active
- Genre: Auto show
- Begins: 28 June 2024
- Ends: 30 June 2024
- Frequency: Annually
- Locations: Milan and Monza
- Country: Italy
- Years active: 2021–present
- Most recent: 16 – 18 June 2023
- Previous event: 16 – 20 June 2022
- Next event: 2025
- Attendance: 500,000
- Website: www.milanomonza.com

The Milano Monza Open-Air Motor Show (MIMO) is an annual auto show first held in June 2021 in Milan and Monza, Italy.

== History ==
Initially scheduled for June 2020 and then postponed to October 2020 and finally postponed again to June 2021 due to the COVID-19 pandemic.

The installations of 63 brands participating in the Milano Monza Open-Air Motor Show 2021 have been placed in an ideal walk that starts from piazza della Scala, crosses corso Vittorio Emanuele II, piazza Duomo, piazza della Scala, to move to via Mercanti, via Dante and then at the Castello Sforzesco and in the Foro Buonaparte.

The event focused on the mobility of the future and on the evolution of the car, and alongside 100% electric (the focus on EVs was present in Piazza Castello), hybrids, city cars and SUVs, visitors also discovered the prototypes of coachbuilders and racing cars. With the help of the QR codes placed on each platform, the public viewed the webpage reserved for each model, with technical data sheets, images, videos and links to contact the manufacturers.

The installations of over 63 brands were present at inaugural edition, including: Alfa Romeo, Aprilia, Aston Martin, Audi, Lamborghini, Bentley, BMW, BMW Motorrad, Bugatti, Cadillac, Citroën, Corvette, Cupra, Dallara, DR, DS, Ducati, Enel X, EVO, Ferrari, Fiat, Ford, Garage Italia, Harley Davidson, Helbiz, Hyundai, Honda, Jaguar, Jeep, Kawasaki, KIA, Lancia, Land Rover, Lexus, MAK Wheels, Maserati, Mazda, McLaren, MG, Militem, MINI, Mitsubishi, Mole Automobiles, Moto Guzzi, MV Agusta, Opel, Pagani, Pambuffetti, Peugeot, Pirelli, Porsche, Renault, SEAT, SEAT MÓ, Škoda, Suzuki, Tazzari EV, Toyota, Volkswagen, and Zero Motorcycles.

=== MIMO 2021 ===
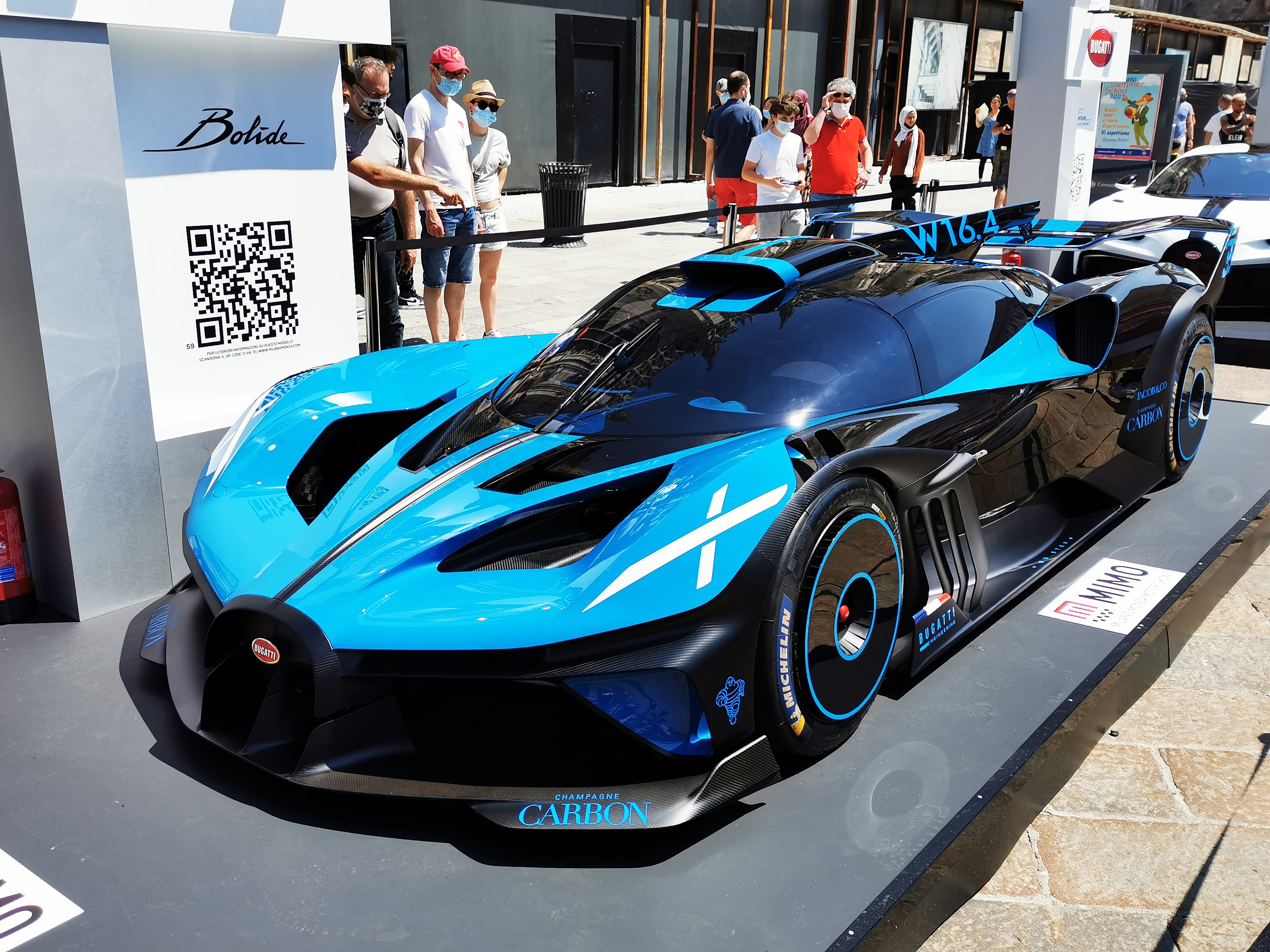
Bugatti Bolide at MIMO 2021

The following vehicles were showcased at the show in 2021:

- Bugatti Chiron Super Sport
- Bugatti Bolide
- Bugatti Chiron Pur Sport
- Bugatti Chiron Sport
- Lamborghini Sián
- Lamborghini Huracán STO
- Audi RS e-tron GT
- Ducati Diavel 1260 S "Black and Steel"
- Cupra Formentor VZ e-HYBRID
- Porsche Taycan 4S Cross Turismo
- Bentley Bentayga V8 First Edition
- McLaren Artura
- SEAT Nuova Leon e-HYBRID
- Suzuki Across Plugin 2.5 Yoru 4WD
- New DR 5.0
- DR 6.0
- EVO 3
- Pambuffetti PJ-01
- Renault Arkana e-Tech Hybrid
- Hyundai Bayon Hybrid 48V
- Toyota Yaris Cross Premiere
- Peugeot 308 Plug-In Hybrid
- Opel Mokka-e
- Jeep Wrangler 4xe Plug-In Hybrid
- Fiat 500 Cabrio BEV ICON
- DS Automobiles DS9 E-TENSE Ibrido Plug-In

=== MIMO 2022 ===
In the 2022 edition, the brands were present: Aiways, Alfa Romeo, Alpine, Aston Martin, Automobili Amos, Lamborghini, Bentley, Chevrolet, Citroën, Dallara, Dodge, DR, DS Automobiles, Energica, EVO, Ferrari, Fiat, Harley-Davidson, Honda, Hyundai, ICKX, Jannarelly, Jeep, Kawasaki, KIA, Lancia, Leasys Rent, Lexus, Mazda, McLaren, Mercedes-Benz, Mitsubishi, Mole Urbana, MV Agusta, Nissan, Opel, Pagani, Peugeot, Pirelli, Ram, Seres, Soriano Motors, Sportequipe, Suzuki, Touring Superleggera, Toyota, XEV, Zagato, Zero Motorcycles.

The following vehicles were showcased at the show in 2022:

- Alfa Romeo Tonale
- Aston Martin DBS
- Aston Martin DBX 707
- Bentley Continental GT V8 Convertible
- Bentley Bentayga S
- Chevrolet Corvette Stingray
- Ferrari 296 GTB
- Lamborghini Huracàn Tecnica
- Lancia Y Ferretti

=== MIMO 2023 ===
In the 2023 edition, the brands were present: AEHRA, Apollo, Bentley, BYD, Cirelli, Dallara, De Tomaso, Dodge, Ferrari, Grassi, Hyundai, Indy Autonomous Challenge, Jannarelly, KTM, Lotus, Maserati, Mazda, McLaren, Mole Urbana, Nissan, Pambuffetti, Polestar, RAM, Suzuki, Suzuki Moto, Volkswagen, Verge Motorcycle, 777 Hypercar.

The following vehicles were showcased at the show in 2023:

- Apollo Intensa Emozione
- Aston Martin Valkyrie
- Bentley Continental GT S
- Bentley Continental GTC
- Bentley Bentayga EWB
- Dallara Stradale IR8
- De Tomaso P72
- Ferrari 296 GTS
- Ferrari 458 Challenge
- Ferrari 488 Challenge EVO
- Ferrari Roma
- Ferrari Monza SP1
- Lotus Evija
- Lotus Eletre
- Lotus Emira
- Maserati GranTurismo
- Maserati MC20
- Maserati Grecale Trofeo
- Maserati Levante Trofeo Futura
- Mazda MX-30 R-EV
- McLaren 750S Spider
- McLaren 765 LT
- McLaren 675 LT
- McLaren Artura

=== MIMO 2024 ===
Milan-Monza, 28–30 June 2024

=== MIMO 2025 ===
Milan-Monza, 27–29 June 2025

The following vehicles were showcased at the show in 2025:

- Ferrari 812 Competizione
- Ferrari SF90 XX
- McLaren Senna
- Pagani Huayra R Evo Roadster
- Pagani Huayra R
- Pagani Huayra Codalunga
- Pagani Utopia Coupé

=== MIMO 2026 ===
Milan-Monza, 26–28 June 2026

The following vehicles were showcased at the show in 2026:

- Ferrari 812 Competizione
- Ferrari SF90 XX
- Ferrari 296 Challenge
- Lamborghini Revuelto
- Maserati GranTurismo
- Maserati MCPura
- McLaren 720S
- Porsche 992 GT3 RS
