= Pepe Serret Borda =

Spanish entrepreneur (1941–1993)

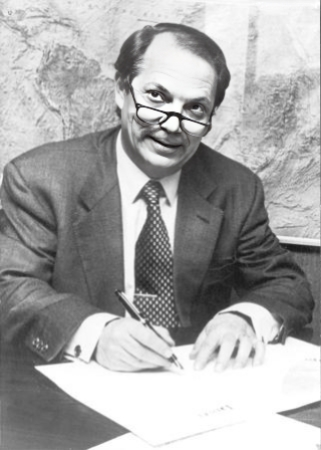
- Born: José Serret Borda; June 1, 1941. Vallfogona de Balaguer, Lérida, Spain
- Died: January 25, 1993 (aged 51); Barcelona
- Education: Engineer Escuela de Ingeniería de Tarrasa, Program in ESADE, PADE IESE Business School
- Occupation: Businessman
- Employers: Managing Director "Lecherías del Noroeste"; Managing Director "Leche El Castillo"; Managing Director "Productos del Café S.A."
- Spouse: Roser Simó Cima
- Children: 11

José Serret Borda, known as Pepe Serret Borda (Vallfogona de Balaguer, Lleida, June 17, 1941 - Barcelona, January 25, 1993), was a Spanish economist and entrepreneur. He served as the director of various companies in the food sector, was involved in the promotion of Opus Dei's schools, and managed some agricultural schools (EFA).

== Background and education ==
=== Academic background ===
He pursued his initial studies at the school in Vallfogona de Balaguer (Lleida) and continued them at the Brothers of La Salle school in Reus. In Terrassa, he pursued studies in Industrial Technical Engineering, complementing his academic background with a master's degree from Esade and the Senior Management Program (PADE) at IESE (Barcelona).

=== Professional trajectory ===
His professional career began at the companies Agut S.A. (Terrassa) and Samí (Balaguer). In 1969, he joined Granja Castelló (Mollerusa), and later was appointed director of the factory at Lecherías del Noroeste S.A (LENOSA) in León, where he worked for nine years. In 1977, he returned to Mollerussa as the Managing Director of Leche el Castillo, a position he held until 1991. On January 1, 1992, he joined Nestlé AEPA and took on the role of Managing Director of Productos del Café S.A. (Reus).

Parallel to his professional work, in 1979 he became part of the founding group of the Arabell school, which at that time belonged to Opus Dei's Fomento de Centros de Enseñanza. He was actively involved in launching the educational institution, which began its journey (September 15, 1979) provisionally in Raimat, an elegant modernist building that had been used for years as the school for girls in the town. The school moved to its permanent location on October 2, 1980, on the road from Lleida to Huesca.

=== Personal life ===
In 1965, he married Roser Simó Cima, with whom he had eleven children: María de los Ángeles, María del Carmen, Roser, Jaime, Toni, Josep, Jordi, Kiko, Rafa, Mariona, and Joan.

In May 1980, he applied for admission to Opus Dei as a Supernumerary member. Upon his passing, his friends and colleagues compiled about a hundred tributes in a book titled "Pepe Serret: Recuerdos de sus amigos" (Pepe Serret: Memories from his friends). Years later, the first biography of Pepe Serret would be published: "Himno a la vida, 1ª ed., 2000. Biografía del empresario Josep Serret Borda (1941-1993)" (Hymn to Life, 1st ed., 2000. Biography of the businessman Josep Serret Borda (1941-1993)).

He died in a traffic accident on January 25, 1993, while returning from Madrid and heading to a parent meeting at his children's school.

== Official bibliographies ==
- Coverdale, John F, "Encounters: Finding God in All Walks of Life", Scepter, 2023, 1st edition, 187-209 pp.
- Rico Romero, Octavio - Xandri, Juan (eds.), "Pepe Serret: Recuerdos de sus amigos" (Pepe Serret: Memories from his Friends). Lleida, 1994, 1st edition, 371 pp.
- Raventós Artés, Lluís, "Himne a la vida: Una semblança de Josep Serret" (Hymn to Life: A Portrait of Josep Serret). Terrassa, Albada, 1998, 1st edition, 112 pp.
- Raventós Artés, Lluís, "Pepe Serret: Himno a la Vida" (Pepe Serret: Hymn to Life). Madrid, Palabra, 2000, 1st Spanish edition, 122 pp. (2nd edition, 2000).
