= EFAS =

EFAS may refer to:

- European Federation of Autonomic Societies
- European Flood Awareness System
- Enroute Flight Advisory Service, an advisory system for aircraft in flight, termed Flight watch in the United States

== See also ==
- EFA (disambiguation)
