= Advanced Distribution Automation =

Advanced Distribution Automation (ADA) is a term coined by the IntelliGrid project in North America to describe the extension of intelligent control over electrical power grid functions to the distribution level and beyond. It is related to distribution automation that can be enabled via the smart grid. The electrical power grid is typically separated logically into transmission systems and distribution systems. Electric power transmission systems typically operate above 110kV, whereas Electricity distribution systems operate at lower voltages. Normally, electric utilities with SCADA systems have extensive control over transmission-level equipment, and increasing control over distribution-level equipment via distribution automation. However, they often are unable to control smaller entities such as Distributed energy resources (DERs), buildings, and homes. It may be advantageous to extend control networks to these systems for a number of reasons:

- Distributed generation is increasingly important in power grids around the world. This generation can help to support local power grids in the presence of blackouts, and ease the load on long-distance transmission lines, but it can also destabilize the grid if not managed correctly". Usually, utility control centers are unable to manage distributed generators directly, and this may be a valuable capability in the future.
- Industrial and residential loads are increasingly controlled through demand response. For example, during periods of peak electrical demand in the summer, the utility control centers may be able to raise the thermostats of houses enrolled in a load reduction program, to temporarily decrease electrical demand from a large number of customers without significantly affecting their comfort. Customers are usually compensated for their participation in such programs.
- To enable demand side management, where homes, businesses, and even electric vehicles may be able to receive real-time pricing (RTP) signals from their distribution companies and dynamically adjust their own energy consumption profiles to minimize costs. This would also preserve customer autonomy and mitigate privacy issues.
- To further the penetration and quality of self-healing, which reduces or eliminates outage time through the use of sensor and control systems embedded in the distribution system.

The goal of Advanced Distribution Automation is real-time adjustment to changing loads, generation, and failure conditions of the distribution system, usually without operator intervention. This necessitates control of field devices, which implies enough information technology (IT) development to enable automated decision making in the field and relaying of critical information to the utility control center. The IT infrastructure includes real-time data acquisition and communication with utility databases and other automated systems. Accurate modeling of distribution operations supports optimal decision making at the control center and in the field.

Automated control of devices in distribution systems is closed-loop control of switching devices, voltage controllers, and capacitors based on recommendations of the distribution optimization algorithms.

Distribution System Reliability: Distribution Automation currently increased system reliability, and new technology such as solid state transformers

Increasing Utilization of Existing Infrastructure: As a component of ADA infrastructure, the new system concepts will enable more efficient operation of the power system, allowing closer control of voltage profiles (e.g. conservation voltage reduction, closely related to voltage optimisation) and maximization of energy throughput.

Distribution System of the Future: The new system concepts will enable ADA functions in the distribution system that contribute to outage prevention and recovery, optimal system performance under changing conditions, and reduced operating costs. Distribution automation technologies are commercially available for wide scale utility deployment. The key is identifying and unlocking the values which provide the best return on investment in ways that can be measured by utilities. Applications which may have greatest potential are operations and efficiency, management of peak loads via [demand response], predictive technologies and communications for equipment, and system restoration technologies.

New transformer technologies are being considered by EPRI, including solid state transformers that can reduce power losses due to step-up and step-down voltages conversion.
