= Block heat and power plant =

Constructed heat and power generation facility

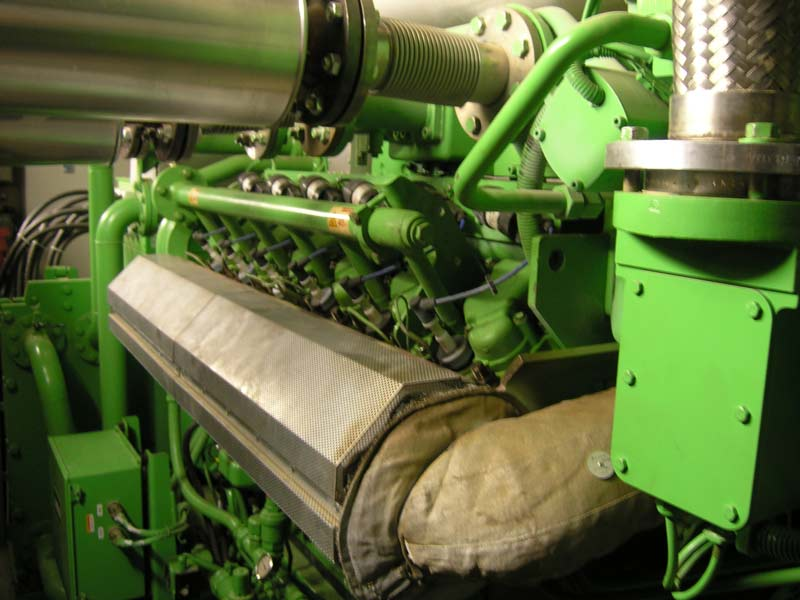
Biogas BHPP in Güssing, Austria

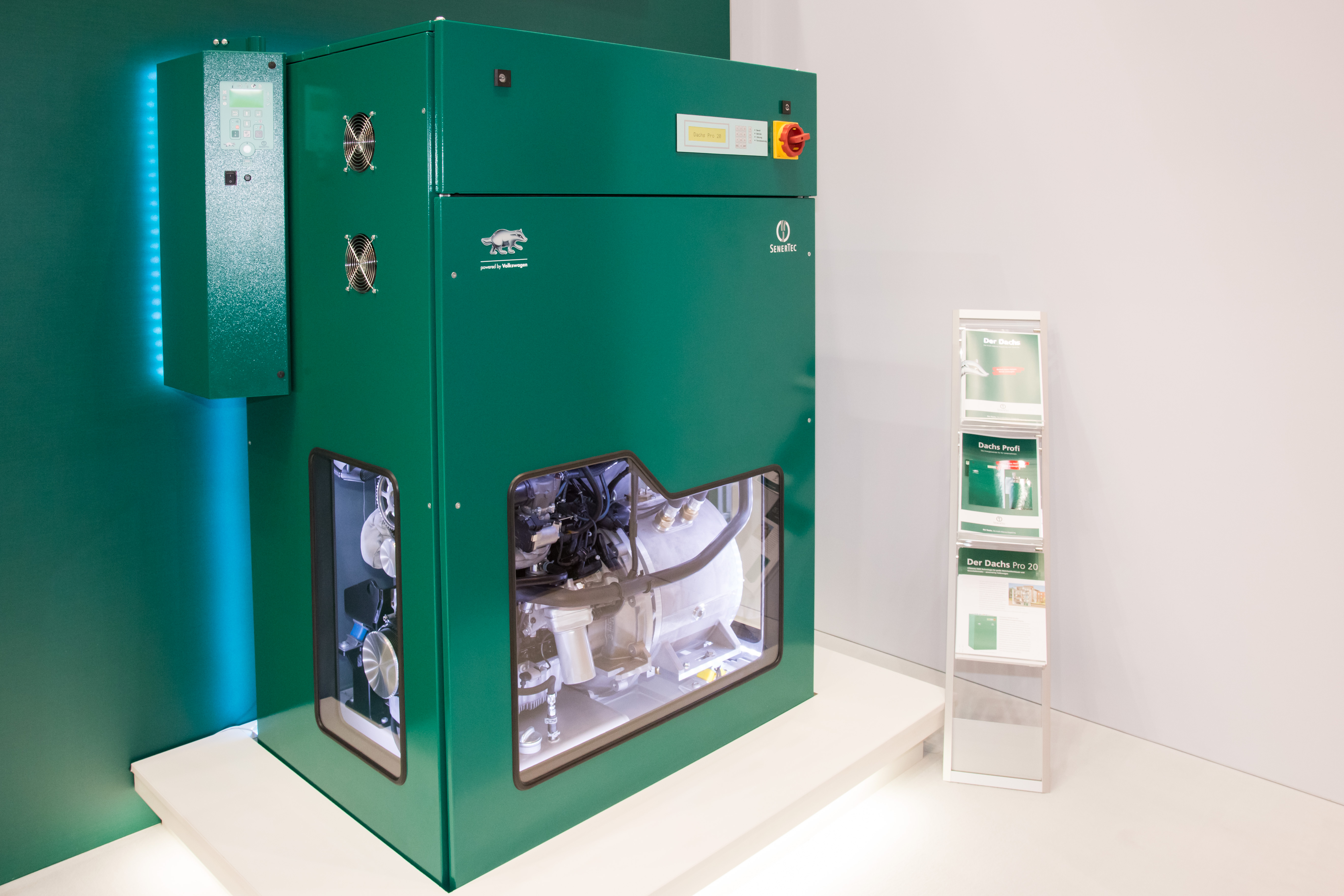
Fully enclosed mini plant

Block heat and power plants (BHPPs) are modular facilities or installations that generate both electrical energy and heat for local heat requirements. They may also feed heat for distribution into local heat networks. Their underlying principle is called cogeneration.

As prime movers for the generators, BHPPs may use internal combustion engines such as Diesel, plant oil and gas engines, but also gas turbines, stirling engines or even generate electricity directly with fuel cells.

Since BHPPs make use of the waste heat from the electricity generation, they achieve better capacity factors than the conventional combination of local heating and centralized power stations. Depending on size, BHPPs with combustion engines achieve an energy conversion efficiency of 25% to 44% of the fuel's total heat of combustion). BHPPs using fuel cells may achieve an electrical efficiency of 55% to 60%. If the waste heat is used locally and to the greatest possible extent, it is possible to reach 80 to 90% total efficiency relative to the primary energy content. While condensing boilers are almost 100% efficient, they do not generate any electricity. (Also note different efficiency definitions are used for condensing boilers.)

Common BHPP modules are available with electrical power outputs between one kilowatt (kW) and tens of megawatts (MW). Units below 50 kW are also called mini cogeneration plants, and installations up to 10 kW are known as micro cogeneration. Devices under 2.5 kW may be called nano BHPPs. Mini and micro BHPP are used to supply residential areas and business centers, hospitals, water parks and apartment buildings, but also small factories and housing developments. The nano class is even suitable for individual family homes. Cogeneration is also used by large central plants, typically with several hundred MW of electrical power.

== Modes of operation ==
=== Heat controlled operation ===
Heat controlled operation means that the power output of the BHPP is regulated to satisfy local heat requirements. In order to modulate the heat output, individual modules may be switched on and off, depending on demand. If there is only a single power module, either its power output is controlled with respect to the current demand or excess heat is used to intermittently charge a heat reservoir. The heat reservoir's size is often chosen such that the prime mover needs at least an hour to fully charge it. As the maintenance intervals are based on the power-on hours of the unit, intermittent operation is usually more efficient than modulated operation. As much as possible of the electricity generated by such plants is used locally while the excess is fed into the public energy grid against reimbursement.

=== Power controlled operation ===
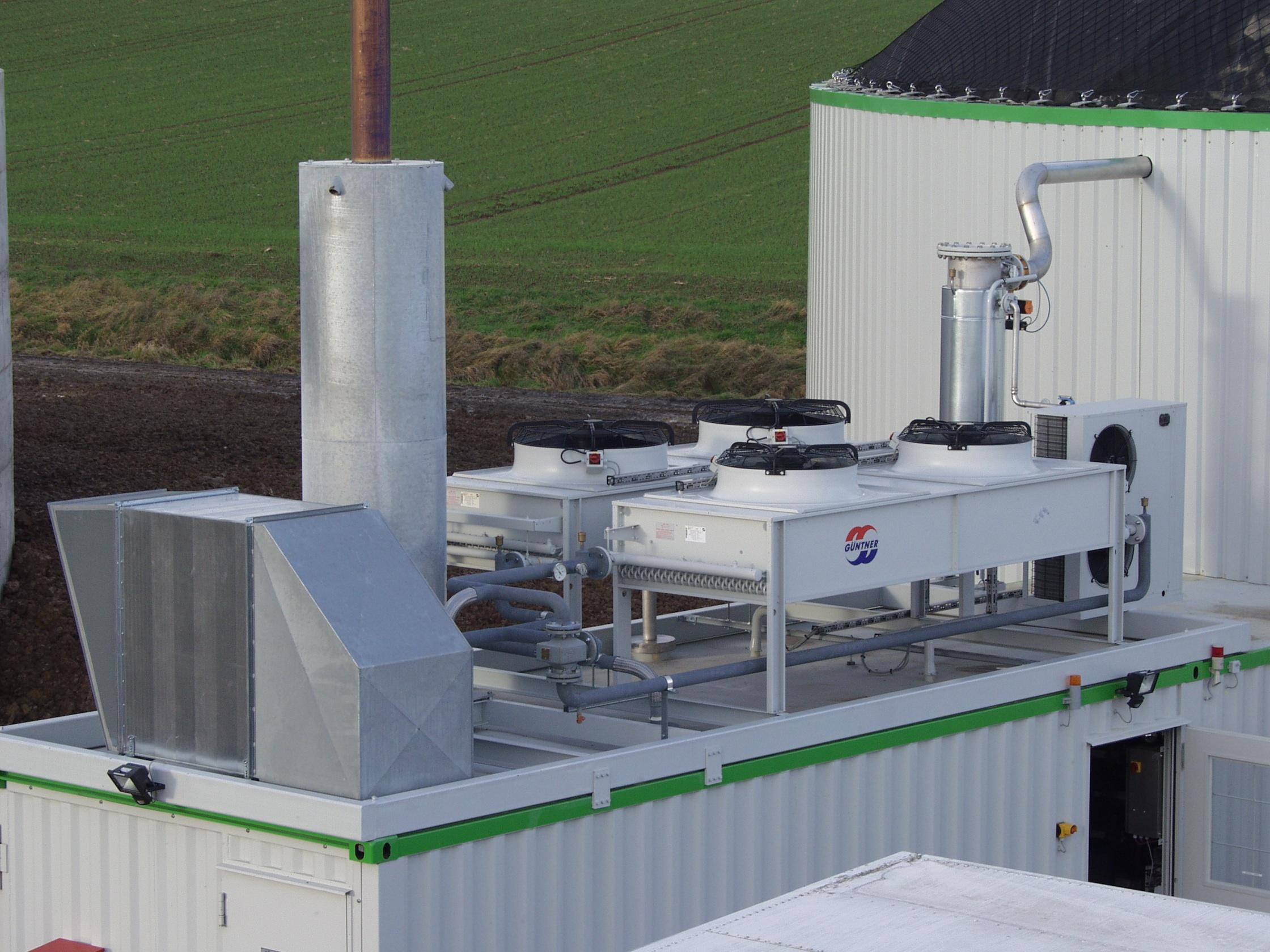
Emergency cooler (note horizontal fans) on the container roof of a biogas BHPP

In a power controlled BHPP, the power delivery is regulated according to the current demand for electricity or the unit's maximum capacity. Waste heat that is not required, is dissipated to the environment via emergency cooling systems, reducing efficiency. This mode of operation is frequently chosen for microgrids and islands. In Germany, certain BHPP running on renewable fuels are power controlled. Since minimum feed-in tariffs for renewables were legally mandated by the German Renewable Energy Sources Act or EEG (German: Erneuerbare-Energien-Gesetz), the operators were able to maximize profit by maximizing electricity generation while disregarding excess heat generation. The latest changes of the EEG have attempted to curtail this kind of abuse.

=== Power oriented operation ===
Under a power oriented regime, heat demand remains the main control parameter while satisfying the electricity demand is taken into account as much as possible. The BHPP is run when there is a demand for power, either using up the heat immediately or buffering it via thermal energy storage for later use. The BHPP does not have emergency cooling. When the power demand is low, heat requirements are mainly served from storage buffers, and the BHPP is added when heat storage runs low. This mode of operation maximizes the users' own use of generated electricity without efficiency losses and condensation operation.

=== Grid controlled operation ===
Grid control means the power levels of several networked BHPPs are dictated by a central agency. This control center optimizes unit commitment across several decentralized cogeneration systems while taking into account economic factors such as common contracts for fuel supply and residual electricity feed-in. Grid control is the basic concept behind virtual power plants. As with power control, thermal energy storage is needed as a buffer to temporarily decouple heat generation and demand.

== Layout ==
The capacity of a heat controlled BHPP is chosen such that even under full load, it will only cover a part of the maximum heat energy requirements of the connected consumers while the rest is satisfied by a peak load boiler as needed. This ensures that the costly electricity generating plants are used more efficiently, running over longer time periods. They should ideally aim to be run for at least 7,900 hours per year but many only reach 3,000 to 5,000 annual hours of operation.

Using buffer storage, micro BHHP for residential buildings are operated monovalently, which means they are not augmented by a peak load boiler. Such a BHPP is not sized with respect to the basic heat energy requirements as described above but with respect to peak load like a conventional heating system. This kind of layout is put forth especially for mini BHPPs. Plants of this size are intermittently switched on and off (so-called "chopping"), shortening their life spans.

An existing heating system can usually be retained when converting to a mini BHPP with only minor changes. For one, there is the option of monovalent BHPP operation with increased heat storage capacity. If the heat is insufficient during the winter months, the existing boiler or a peak load boiler may be added (bivalent operation). If extra heat is rarely required, it can even be cost-efficient to add a simple electric heater basically working like an immersion heater. And even larger BHPPs can be optimized by using thermal energy storage, used to buffer heat demand peaks to avoid requesting extra heat generation outside of the cogeneration system (by a boiler). In addition, they allow temporary power controlled operation, meaning charging the heat storage during times of day when energy prices are peaking.

== Ecology and environmental aspects ==
The basic economy and the ecological concept of heat controlled operation is to use all of the generated heat while using as much of the electric power locally as possible. Surplus power is fed into the public electrical grid and reimbursed. Since this means that less conventional power station capacity is required for power generation, the increased use of BHPP replaces electricity generated in mid-load periods in fossil fuel "condensation" power plants (that only generate electrical power but no useful heat, mainly coal-fired power plants) and therefore helps to lower carbon dioxide emissions.

In total, BHPPs achieve much higher capacity factors (useful electrical energy plus useful thermal energy divided by energy input), compared to the regular mixed mode operation of local heating and centralized power grid. For example, a large modern steam–electric power station fired with bituminous coal is about 45% efficient. This means that more than half of its energy output is waste heat. Making use of this heat by way of district heating would incur significant transport losses (10–15%) while necessitating an elaborate and costly piping network since heat generation and heat consumers are usually separated over long distances for large central power plants. Transporting the electrical power through the grid incurs further losses of two to five per cent. BHPPs achieve an electrical efficiency between 25 and 38% (depending on type and size); the total efficiency of around 90% is only achievable when power and heat are used locally. The benefit of being able to use process heat locally relies on having suitable consumers. Residential buildings have seasonally different heat requirements which means the process heat can only be partially utilized during the summer months.

Maintenance expenditures for the engines (like oil changes and air cleaners, spark plugs for gas engines and such) and payments for service contractors worsen the overall economy since the specific outlay increases significantly for smaller and decentralised units, especially for micro BHPPs.

The use of palm oil as fuel is especially detrimental. Palm oil is cultivated on plantations in many developing countries and emerging markets at the cost of destroying rain forest, often even by way of illegal logging, despite the efforts of alliances such as the RSPO (Round Table of Sustainable Palm Oil). The remaining rain forests are being destroyed at increasing rates because of the rising demand for palm oil in fuels, food, cosmetics and such.

=== Emissions ===
In contrast to conventional heating systems, BHPPs may not only generate exhaust emissions but also significant noise emissions and need to comply with applicable government regulations. Noxious gas emissions released by combustion include carbon monoxide, unburnt hydrocarbons and nitrogen oxide, for Diesel fuels also particulate matter ("soot") and sulfur dioxide. In the presence of sufficient oxygen, carbon monoxide and hydrocarbons can be converted to CO_{2} and are not critical below λ>1. However, enriching the mixture incurs the risk of unintentional methane release. The cylinder walls of combustion engines are much cooler than the mixture, which means that the combustive reaction stops in their vicinity, letting unburnt hydrocarbons escape. In lean-burn, the temperature of the mixture is lowered by the increased mass of the additional air, exacerbating this issue. If the exhaust is sufficiently hot (> 760 °C), the hydrocarbon fraction may be further reduced by thermal post-oxidation. In lean-burn operation, the exhaust is too cold to convert the unburnt hydrocarbons (or the methane in natural gas engines) via exhaust treatment, which means as a rule, any nitrogen oxide emission limits need to be met by the primary internal combustion itself, even though secondary exhaust treatment measures may help to comply with emission limits. The choice of exhaust treatment depends on the specific application and applicable regulations. Besides the budget and available space, the running costs of maintenance, repair and operation (upkeep) have to be taken into account. Finally, the total efficiency of the installation and the expected emissions are critical factors determining the suitability of any given BHPP design. Certain technical measures have proven effective since filtering out harmful fuel components from standard fuels is not economical.

==== Noise ====
Noise emissions can be mitigated by structural engineering to minimize the transfer of vibrations, reducing them far enough to comply with applicable guidelines for residential areas.

==== Catalytic converters ====
Catalytic converters transform NO_{x} HC and CO in the exhaust gas at the same time, using precious metals, as long as the engine is run at a stoichiometric fuel rate (λ=1). Inside the converter, temperatures above 300 °C are needed for these reactions to occur and achieve conversion rates above 90%. For methane, especially high temperatures above 600 °C are required. A drawback is restricted engine operation which lowers the total efficiency of the installation.

==== Lean-burn ====
Lean-burn engines are usually tuned to a lambda between 1.45 and 1.6. A potential increase of CO in the exhaust may be lowered again by adding an oxidation catalytic converter. Following
$$\Delta T = \frac{Q}{m \cdot c_p}$$
the mixture burns at lower overall temperatures because of the extra air mass, which means methane remains unburnt. Additionally, because of the CO shortage, there is insufficient reducing agent available to reduce nitrogen oxides. Applicable regulations might therefore necessitate tuning the engine to optimize for NO_{x} emissions, which means the engine cannot be run at peak overall efficiency. Nevertheless, such installations are distinguished by low investment, maintenance and operation costs which make them highly economical for smaller installations. An oxidation catalytic converter can be added downstream to further lower formaldehyde, greenhouse gas and CO emissions.

==== Selective Catalytic Reduction ====
Selective catalytic reduction is an alternative for applications where neither lean-burn nor three-way catalytic converters are feasible. The process is used mainly for Diesel engines, gas Diesel engines and supercharged Otto engines. The SCR converter is downstream of the oxidation catalytic converter while adding urea allows to reduce nitrogen oxides to nitrogen and steam. Since the reaction is exothermal, heat is generated that can be utilized by an exhaust heat exchanger. The reduction agent, usually ammonia, may be added in pure, gaseous form or as an aqueous urea solution such as AdBlue. Another option is to inject urea via a pressurized air metering valve. If an aqueous solution is used, the enthalpy of vaporization needs to be overcome, lowering thermal efficiency. On the other hand, handling and storage are more straightforward. At ≈300 °C, the operating temperature of the SCR converter is lower than that of the oxidation converter. In some cases, a heat exchanger has to be inserted in between for temperature control. An SCR system means a greater investment which needs to be recuperated over time to be economical. It allows operating the engine under ideal conditions all the time since neither stoichiometric combustion nor regeneration periods are required, lowering fuel consumption by three to eight per cent.

== Technology ==
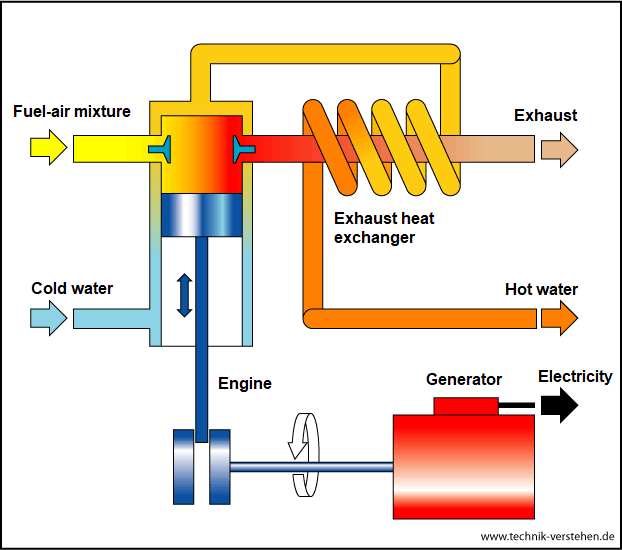
Functional schematic of an engine-driven block heat and power plant

Originally, BHPP installations were designed around internal combustion engines whose waste heat was extracted from the exhaust gas and coolant circuit in order to heat the water of a heating system. These days, other engine designs with lower efficiency are also being used as prime movers to power generators, such as Stirling engines or steam motors. Depending on the type of combustion engine, BHPPs are no longer limited to just heating rooms and buildings but may also be utilized to generate process heat via steam, heat hot air or heat transfer oil, or power air conditioning systems via absorption heat pumps. These then use the waste heat of the BHPP installation for cooling.

As motor fuel, mainly fossil or regenerative hydrocarbons are used such as heating oil, vegetable oil fuel (mostly palm oil), biodiesel (for Diesel engines) or natural gas but also liquefied petroleum gas, biogas, sewage gas and landfill gas (for Otto engines), multifuel engines or gas turbines. Wood chips and pellet fuels as renewable resources for Stirling engines, steam power units and wood gasifiers may also be used, the latter in combination with Otto engines (efficiency <36%). BHPPs using Diesel or Stirling engines can be run on light fuel oil.

BHPP installations based on combustion engines and gas turbines generate heat in their coolant systems and exhaust gas which is transferred to the heating circuits of buildings via heat exchangers. This allows to achieve utilization factors of up to 95%, depending on the capacity factor and efficiency of the specific engine. Depending on the specific fuel, size and design (for example with or without turbo chargers), the purely electrical efficiency under full engine and generator load are between 20% (for micro-BHPPs) and up to 43% (for Diesel engines above 1 MW).

Smaller BHPPs (micro BHPPs) up to about ten kW of electrical and around 20 kW thermal power are suited for heating family homes, apartment buildings and small businesses. Medium BHPPs up to several hundred kW of electrical power are frequently used by municipal utilities to heat residential neighborhoods, municipal swimming pools and larger commercial operations. Large BHPPs with gas engines of several MW can provide heat and power for larger neighborhoods, industrial estates and factories.

=== Gas mixer types ===
==== Impco ====
The variable restriction gas mixer (Impco) utilizes a special gas metering valve whose external shape makes it relatively simple to control the lambda with respect to the mass flow. The desired characteristic is achieved by matching the shape of this valve to the required lambda progression. Adjustment is also possible via the spring inside the vacuum chamber. This type of gas mixer can be used either on the suction side or the pressure side. The main benefit is its mechanical simplicity since there is no electronically controlled actuator. The drawback is its fixed setting, mandating to maintain a specific lambda during tuning. This simple design is sufficient for engines with low demands on emissions but does not allow to compensate for variations in calorific value or changing environmental parameters. It has the least favorable trade-off between mass flow and resistance for modern gas engines with high mean pressures.

==== Venturi mixer ====
Venturi mixers are another widely used standard gas mixer design. Here, the required lambda is set by matching the gas pre pressure to the intake cross section. The mixer is controlled by a throttle in the gas feed which often takes the form of an external, ring-shaped manifold. The advantage of this mixer type is that pressure losses can be mitigated with relative ease, making it suitable for engines with high mean pressures.

==== HOMIX ====
In an orifice mixer (HOMIX), the lambda is set via the area ratio between the air and gas intake cross sections. This concept allows simple adjustment of that area ratio during operation, which is especially beneficial for lean-burn engines. However, it always requires a pressure regulator to match the pressure of the gas supply to the intake pressure ahead of the compressor.

==== TecJet ====
The TecJet mixer is a variation of the orifice mixer. This system has been developed from a concept with an axially sliding set piston to utilize a very finely adjustable throttle valve. Such a design is able to control large variations in calorific value and other parameters with very short reaction times (100 ms).

==== Port injection ====
In large gas engines, the mixture may be formed just ahead of the intake valves, making for a shorter distance for the combustible mixture. Port injection is used for cylinder displacements of ten liters and above in combination with a swirl chamber to achieve a more homogeneous mixture. This design allows for individual cylinder control.

=== Hydrogen operation ===
==== Hybrid operation ====
In hybrid operation, hydrogen is mixed with natural gas. Up to ten per cent by volume of hydrogen can be added with minor modifications such as adding a flame arrester to the intake. For higher hydrogen concentrations up to 25 per cent, additional modifications are required, such as port fuel injection or low pressure direct injection spark plugs. Additionally, a hardware or software upgrade of the engine electronics is needed to correct the gas mixture in order to minimize knocking and counter the lower efficiency of hydrogen operation.

==== Pure hydrogen operation ====
In order to run more than 25 per cent by volume of hydrogen, turbo chargers and pistons need to be modified. This allows to achieve overall efficiencies of up to 80% in combined heat and electric output.

== Economy ==
A long annual runtime at high load is crucial for the economical viability of any BHPP installation and typically needs to exceed about 4,000 hours under full load per year. At the same time, operators strive to recoup their investment by way of financial compensation for the generated energy and heat or by cost reductions, respectively.

To this end, in heat controlled BHPPs, the annual load duration curve of the heat requirement—a chart showing how much heat is required for how many hours over the course of the year—is used to determine the heat output that comes to a runtime of about 3,000 hours per year. This gives the necessary peak heat output of the BHPP installation; it is usually 25–30% of the peak heat requirement. In order to be able to generate different power levels, BHPPs sometimes use several engines in a modular design.

For residential buildings, the heat requirement fluctuates strongly over the course of the year, with only domestic water heating required during the summer months in moderate climates. Currently there are only a few BHPP models with the capability to variate the generated heat and the coupled electricity output ("modulated operation"). It is possible though to compensate for fluctuations in heat demand if their amplitude is limited by thermal energy storage buffers. The common solution is to operate the BHPP in tandem with a conventional boiler for heat demand peaks and as a reserve in case of breakdowns and maintenance. If there are no such compensating features for fluctuations, the entire installation frequently switches on and off ("chopping"), reducing its efficiency and life span.

In a comprehensive economical analysis, all investment and operative costs—such as depreciation, fuel and maintenance—are tallied and compared to the returns for heat and electricity or the respective cost savings as well as possible subsidies.

For example, in the summer, an additional absorption refrigerator may be installed to make use of the generated heat for air conditioning purposes. This is called Trigeneration. Future plans also comprise networking several BHPP into virtual power plants where many distributed BHPP are controlled centrally. Because of the increasing share of wind and solar energy, BHPP with heat buffers may be able to operate even more economically since wind and solar neither take the current electricity demand into account, nor are they suitable for generating a basic load. This is where BHPPs may come in, supplying electricity for current local requirements while charging hot water storage tanks.

A fundamental problem for the marketing of BHPP especially for family homes and apartment blocks is their higher initial investment cost, compared to conventional natural gas or oil-fired boilers.

In a direct comparison, piston engines have a higher electrical efficiency and lower specific investment costs while microturbines are able to use gas with lower calorific heat, combine longer life spans with lower operation and maintenance costs and are less noisy.

== Literature ==
- Suttor, Wolfgang (2014). Blockheizkraftwerke: ein Leitfaden für den Anwender. BINE-Fachbuch (8., überarb. Aufl ed.). Stuttgart: Fraunhofer IRB-Verl. ISBN 978-3-8167-9303-8. (German guide for BHPP operators in the housing industry, development, municipalities and utilities)
