= Demand factor =

Refers to the fractional amount of some quantity

In telecommunications, electronics and the electrical power industry, the term demand factor is used to refer to the fractional amount of some quantity being used relative to the maximum amount that could be used by the same system. The demand factor is always less than or equal to one. As the amount of demand is a time dependent quantity so is the demand factor.

$$f_\text{Demand}(t) = \frac{\text{Demand}}{\text{Maximum possible demand}}$$

The demand factor is often implicitly averaged over time when the time period of demand is understood by the context.

== Electrical engineering ==
In electrical engineering the demand factor is taken as a time independent quantity where the numerator is taken as the maximum demand in the specified time period instead of the averaged or instantaneous demand.

$$f_\text{Demand} = \frac{\text{Maximum load in given time period}}{\text{Maximum possible load}}$$

This is the peak in the load profile divided by the full load of the device.

Example: If a residence has equipment which could draw 6,000 W when all equipment was drawing a full load, drew a maximum of 3,000 W in a specified time, then the demand factor = 3,000 W / 6,000 W = 0.5

This quantity is relevant when trying to establish the amount of load for which a system should be rated. In the above example, it would be unlikely that the system would be rated to 6,000 W, even though there may be a slight possibility that this amount of power can be drawn. This is closely related to the load factor which is the average load divided by the peak load in a specified time period.

$$f_\text{Load} = \frac{\text{Average load}}{\text{Maximum load in given time period}}$$

== See also ==
- Capacity factor
- List of energy storage projects
- Diversity factor
- Utilization factor
