= Pambuffetti PJ-01 =

Sports car produced by Pambuffetti

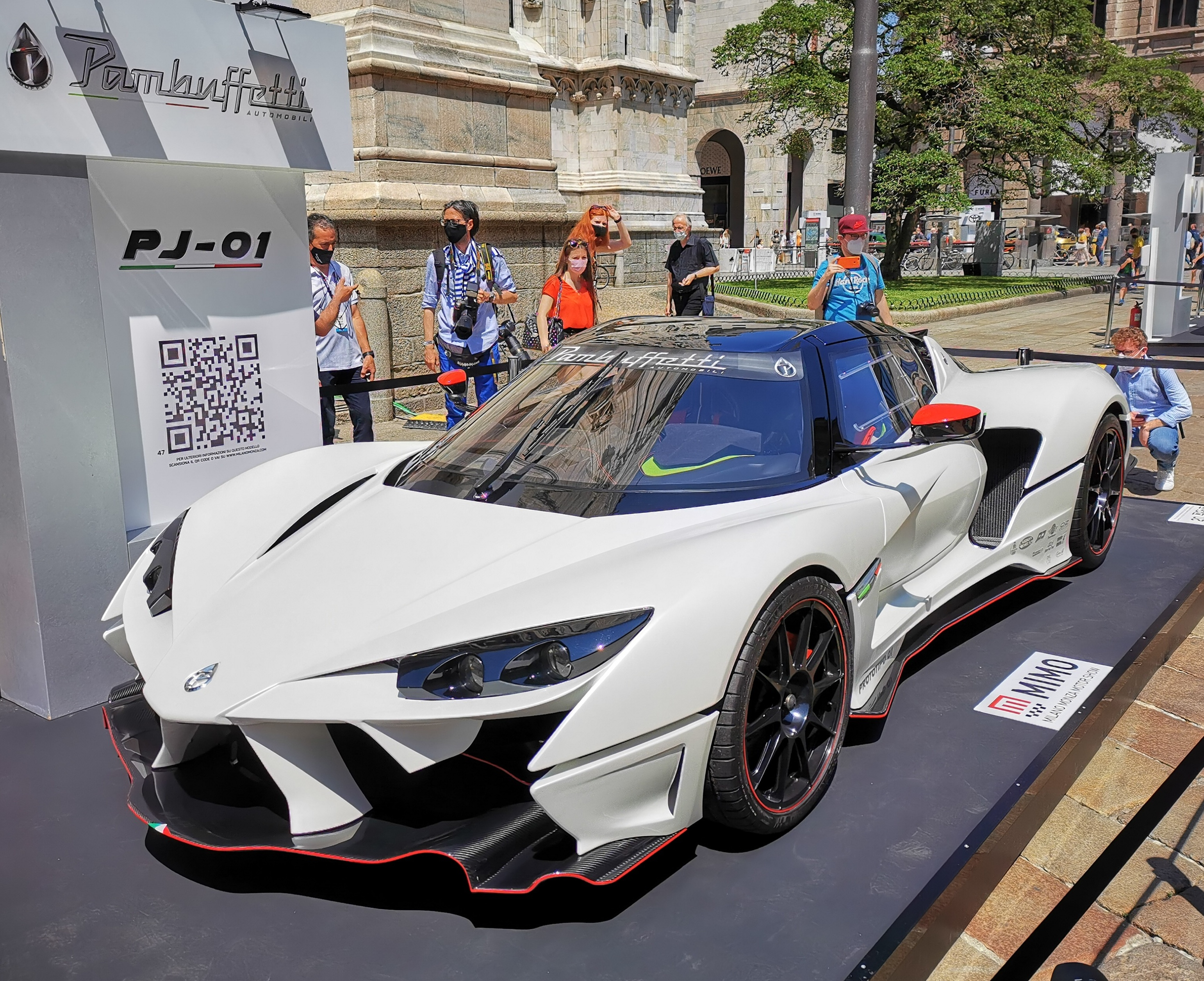
- Pambuffetti PJ-01 at the 2021 Milano Monza Open-Air Motor Show

Overview
- Manufacturer: Pambuffetti Automobili
- Production: 2022–present (25 units planned)

Body and chassis
- Class: Sports car (S)
- Body style: 2-door coupe
- Layout: RMR

Powertrain
- Engine: 5,204 cubic centimetres (317.6 cu in; 5.204 L) Pambufetti modified Lamborghini V10
- Power output: 820 brake horsepower (830 PS; 610 kW) @ 8,500 rpm 800 newton-metres (590 lbf⋅ft) @ 6,000 rpm
- Transmission: 7-speed Sequential

Dimensions
- Wheelbase: 2,750 mm (108 in)
- Length: 4,700 mm (190 in)
- Width: 2,060 mm (81 in)
- Height: 1,150 mm (45 in)
- Kerb weight: ~1,100 kg (2,400 lb)

The Pambuffetti PJ-01 is a sports car produced by Pambufetti, which was founded in 2018 by Juri Pambuffetti.

== History ==
The PJ-01, which has gull-wing doors, was presented at Milano Monza Open-Air Motor Show in June 2021, which was the first edition of the auto show. The production of the sports car is limited to 25 units and is scheduled to begin in Trevi in 2022. Six vehicles are to be built by hand every year. The base price before taxes is 1,500,000 euros. The PJ-01 will also be street legal.

== Specifications ==
The PJ-01 features high downforce values, which makes high cornering speeds and high braking deceleration possible. The power-to-weight ratio of the PJ-01 is given as 1.3 kilograms per hp, so it weighs about 1100 kg. It is designed as a naturally aspirated engine and is designed to accelerate the sports car to 100 km/h (62 mph) in three seconds. The top speed is specified by Pambuffetti PJ-01 as 320 km/h (200 mph). The steering wheel is designed based on that of one used in Formula One and can also be removed. The seating position is also based on F1 racing cars.
