= Electricity Forward Agreement =

A daily load profile usually consists of base load, peak load and possibly several hourly forward contract (in orange).

Electricity Forward Agreement (calendar) (short: EFA system) is a calendar used to specify load profiles when trading on the electricity market. It was officially only valid until October 2014 but is still abundantly used among commodity traders.

== Features of the EFA calendar ==
One distinguishes between weekdays WD and weekend WE since the electricity consumption is clearly lower on Saturdays and Sundays. An EFA day starts at 11pm local time and runs through 11pm the next (astronomical) day. An EFA-week WK consists of five WD and two WE-days. An EFA month is defined differently than common months: March, June, September, and December have five weeks, while all other months are considered to have exactly four weeks. The two EFA seasons are winter (WK 40 – WK 13) and summer (WK 14 – WK 39), each having exactly 26 weeks. Due to the existence of leap years, some EFA-Decembers have six weeks (e.g. 2004 and 2009), a strong difference from the commonly used Gregorian calendar system, where February is the leap month.

The EFA day is composed of six blocks of 4 hours each. For each block, baseload products exist (i.e. WD 1/2/3/4/5/6 and WE 1/2/3/4/5/6). Peak load products only exist for WD3, WD4, and WD5 (also on bank holidays), and consequently off-peak products are only available for the remaining EFA blocks of each week. Blocks 1 and 2 are usually termed overnight blocks; the other blocks are day blocks.
