= Eyes for Africa =

Australia-based non-profit organisation

Eyes For Africa Charity (EFA) is an organisation facilitating no-cost ophthalmic surgery for people living in regional Ethiopia who would otherwise have no access to this service. Eyes For Africa is a non-government, non-religious, not-for-profit organisation.

Eyes For Africa Charitable Foundation was established in 2007 and is a Registered Charity. Julie Tyers is its founder and principal driving force. Tyers is an ophthalmic nurse with over 30 years experience. She has also great experience from several trips with the College of Surgeons to Timor to assist with cataract operations there under an AUSAID funded project. In recognition of her work, Julie was honored to receive the Deakin University Leadership in Nursing Award for 2007.

== Programs ==
- 2010 will see Eyes For Africa's 4th visit to Ethiopia
- Eyes For Africa is sponsoring a surgical trainee (including small incision extra capsular excision surgery) at Jimma University, Ethiopia
