= Euro First Air - Canarias Cargo =

Spanish airline

EFA - Canarias Cargo
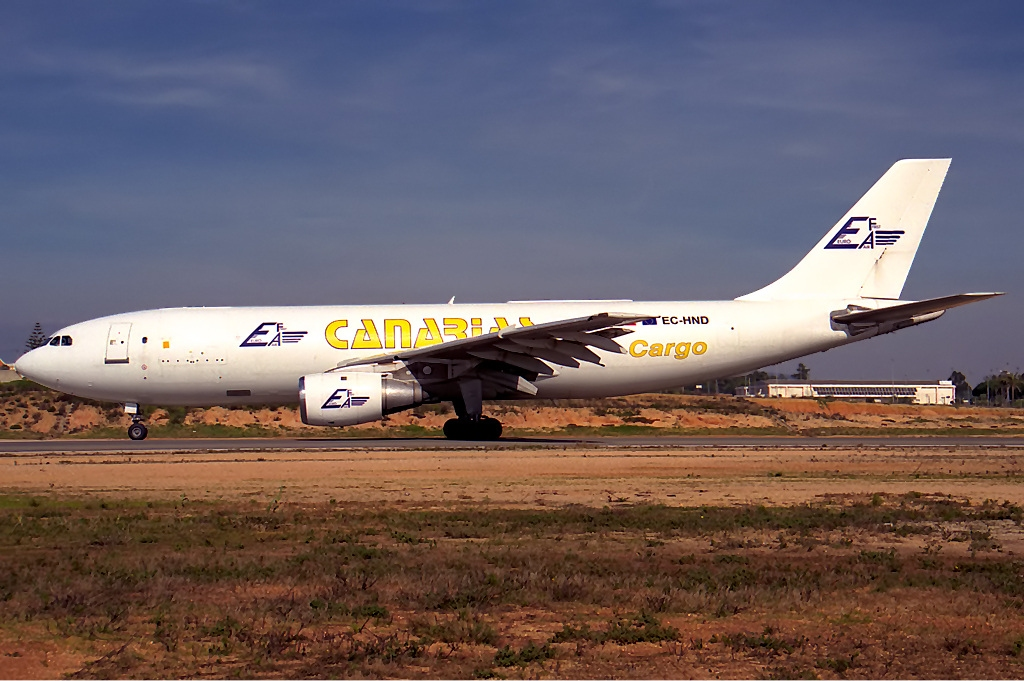
- EFA - Canarias Cargo Airbus A300
IATA	ICAO	Call sign
-	EFA	-
- Commenced operations: 1999
- Ceased operations: 2000
- Operating bases: Gran Canaria Airport
- Fleet size: Fleet below
- Headquarters: Las Palmas de Gran Canaria, Spain

Euro First Air - Canarias Cargo, also known as EFA - Canarias Cargo or simply Canarias Cargo, was an airline based in Las Palmas, Canary Islands, Spain.

== History ==
Euro First Air - Canarias Cargo was founded on 30 November 1999 with headquarters in Las Palmas. The airline projected to establish itself first as a cargo airline between Spain and the US, and later to expand in order to include passenger services as well.

It began operating charter cargo services from its base at Gran Canaria Airport using a single Airbus A300 aircraft.

Owing to financial difficulties EFA - Canarias Cargo ceased all operations the following year. Creditors and unpaid employees filed lawsuits against the airline even after it ceased operating.

== Code data ==
- ICAO Code: EFA (not current)

== Fleet ==
- 1 Airbus A300B4-203
