= Energy demand management =

Modification of consumer demand for energy

Energy demand management, also known as demand-side management (DSM) or demand-side response (DSR), is the modification of consumer demand for energy through various methods including inducing behavioral changes through education and financial incentives.

Usually, the goal of demand-side management is to encourage the consumer to use less energy during peak hours, or to move the time of energy use to off-peak times such as nighttime and weekends. Peak demand management does not necessarily decrease total energy consumption, but could be expected to reduce the grid congestion periods as well as the need for investments in networks and/or power plants for meeting peak demands. An example is the use of energy storage units to store energy during off-peak hours and discharge them during peak hours.

A newer application for DSM is to aid grid operators in balancing variable generation from wind and solar units, particularly when the timing and magnitude of energy demand does not coincide with the renewable generation. Generators brought on line during peak demand periods are often fossil fuel units. Minimizing their use reduces emissions and energy costs.

The term DSM was coined following the time of the 1973 energy crisis and 1979 energy crisis. Governments of many countries mandated performance of various programs for demand management. An early example is the National Energy Conservation Policy Act of 1978 in the U.S., preceded by similar actions in California and Wisconsin. Demand-side management was introduced publicly by Electric Power Research Institute (EPRI) in the 1980s. Nowadays, DSM technologies become increasingly feasible due to the integration of information and communications technology and the power system, new terms such as integrated demand-side management (IDSM), or smart grid.

== Operation ==
The American electric power industry originally relied heavily on foreign energy imports, whether in the form of consumable electricity or fossil fuels that were then used to produce electricity. During the time of the energy crises in the 1970s, the federal government passed the Public Utility Regulatory Policies Act (PURPA), hoping to reduce dependence on foreign oil and to promote energy efficiency and alternative energy sources. This act forced utilities to obtain the cheapest possible power from independent power producers, which in turn promoted renewables and encouraged the utility to reduce the amount of power they need, hence pushing forward agendas for energy efficiency and demand management.

Electricity use can vary dramatically on short and medium time frames, depending on current weather patterns. Generally the wholesale electricity system adjusts to changing demand by dispatching additional or less generation. However, during peak periods, the additional generation is usually supplied by less efficient ("peaking") sources. Unfortunately, the instantaneous financial and environmental cost of using these "peaking" sources is not necessarily reflected in the retail pricing system. In addition, the ability or willingness of electricity consumers to adjust to price signals by altering demand (elasticity of demand) may be low, particularly over short time frames. In many markets, consumers (particularly retail customers) do not face real-time pricing at all, but pay rates based on average annual costs or other constructed prices. However, consumer behavior can be influenced if exposed to financial incentives coupled with access to real time energy prices. This change in behavior might then vary across different income levels as well. For example, people with high income levels may exhibit low responsiveness in demand side management programs compared to people with low income levels. This behavior is also reflective of demand side flexibility potential and how it changes across different socio-economic sectors of the society.

Energy demand management activities attempt to bring the electricity demand and supply closer to a perceived optimum, and help give electricity end users benefits for reducing their demand. In the modern system, the integrated approach to demand-side management is becoming increasingly common. IDSM automatically sends signals to end-use systems to shed load depending on system conditions. This allows for very precise tuning of demand to ensure that it matches supply at all times, reduces capital expenditures for the utility. Critical system conditions could be peak times, or in areas with levels of variable renewable energy, during times when demand must be adjusted upward to avoid over-generation or downward to help with ramping needs.

In general, adjustments to demand can occur in various ways: through responses to price signals, such as permanent differential rates for evening and day times or occasional highly priced usage days, behavioral changes achieved through home area networks, automated controls such as with remotely controlled air-conditioners, or with permanent load adjustments with energy efficient appliances.

== Logical foundations ==
Demand for any commodity can be modified by actions of market players and government (regulation and taxation). Energy demand management implies actions that influence demand for energy. DSM was originally adopted in electricity, but today it is applied widely to utilities including water and gas as well.

Reducing energy demand is contrary to what both energy suppliers and governments have been doing during most of the modern industrial history. Whereas real prices of various energy forms have been decreasing during most of the industrial era, due to economies of scale and technology, the expectation for the future is the opposite. Previously, it was not unreasonable to promote energy use as more copious and cheaper energy sources could be anticipated in the future or the supplier had installed excess capacity that would be made more profitable by increased consumption.

In centrally planned economies subsidizing energy was one of the main economic development tools. Subsidies to the energy supply industry are still common in some countries.

Contrary to the historical situation, energy prices and availability are expected to deteriorate. Governments and other public actors, if not the energy suppliers themselves, are tending to employ energy demand measures that will increase the efficiency of energy consumption.

== Types ==
- Energy efficiency: Using less power to perform the same tasks. This involves a permanent reduction of demand by using more efficient load-intensive appliances such as water heaters, refrigerators, or washing machines.
- Demand response: Any reactive or preventative method to reduce, flatten or shift demand. Historically, demand response programs have focused on peak reduction to defer the high cost of constructing generation capacity. However, demand response programs are now being looked to assist with changing the net load shape as well, load minus solar and wind generation, to help with integration of variable renewable energy. Demand response includes all intentional modifications to consumption patterns of electricity of end user customers that are intended to alter the timing, level of instantaneous demand, or the total electricity consumption. Demand response refers to a wide range of actions which can be taken at the customer side of the electricity meter in response to particular conditions within the electricity system (such as peak period network congestion or high prices), including the aforementioned IDSM. This may also include provisions for consumers to sell electricity to grid when needed. One example could be the Vehicle-to-Grid or V2G technology where consumers can contribute to DSM programs by selling energy to the grid. However, the vehicle charging times and patterns can significantly influence the role of V2G technology in reducing peak demands and managing grid congestion.
- Dynamic demand: Advance or delay appliance operating cycles by a few seconds to increase the diversity factor of the set of loads. The concept is that by monitoring the power factor of the power grid, as well as their own control parameters, individual, intermittent loads would switch on or off at optimal moments to balance the overall system load with generation, reducing critical power mismatches. As this switching would only advance or delay the appliance operating cycle by a few seconds, it would be unnoticeable to the end user. In the United States, in 1982, a (now-lapsed) patent for this idea was issued to power systems engineer Fred Schweppe. This type of dynamic demand control is frequently used for air-conditioners. One example of this is through the SmartAC program in California.
- Distributed energy resources: Distributed generation, also distributed energy, on-site generation (OSG) or district/decentralized energy is electrical generation and storage performed by a variety of small, grid-connected devices referred to as distributed energy resources (DER). Conventional power stations, such as coal-fired, gas and nuclear powered plants, as well as hydroelectric dams and large-scale solar power stations, are centralized and often require electric energy to be transmitted over long distances. By contrast, DER systems are decentralized, modular and more flexible technologies, that are located close to the load they serve, albeit having capacities of only 10 megawatts (MW) or less. These systems can comprise multiple generation and storage components; in this instance they are referred to as hybrid power systems. DER systems typically use renewable energy sources, including small hydro, biomass, biogas, solar power, wind power, and geothermal power, and increasingly play an important role for the electric power distribution system. A grid-connected device for electricity storage can also be classified as a DER system, and is often called a distributed energy storage system (DESS). By means of an interface, DER systems can be managed and coordinated within a smart grid. Distributed generation and storage enables collection of energy from many sources and may lower environmental impacts and improve security of supply.

== Scale ==
Broadly, demand side management can be classified into four categories: national scale, utility scale, community scale, and individual household scale.

=== National scale ===
Energy efficiency improvement is one of the most important demand side management strategies. Efficiency improvements can be implemented nationally through legislation and standards in housing, building, appliances, transport, machines, etc.

=== Utility scale ===
During peak demand time, utilities are able to control storage water heaters, pool pumps and air conditioners in large areas to reduce peak demand, e.g. Australia and Switzerland. One of the common technologies is ripple control: high frequency signal (e.g. 1000 Hz) is superimposed to normal electricity (50 or 60 Hz) to switch on or off devices. In more service-based economies, such as Australia, electricity network peak demand often occurs in the late afternoon to early evening (4pm to 8pm). Residential and commercial demand is the most significant part of these types of peak demand. Therefore, it makes great sense for utilities (electricity network distributors) to manage residential storage water heaters, pool pumps, and air conditioners.

=== Community scale ===
Other names can be neighborhood, precinct, or district. Community central heating systems have been existing for many decades in regions of cold winters. Similarly, peak demand in summer peak regions need to be managed, e.g. Texas & Florida in the U.S., Queensland and New South Wales in Australia. Demand side management can be implemented in community scale to reduce peak demand for heating or cooling. Another aspect is to achieve Net zero-energy building or community.

Managing energy, peak demand and bills in community level may be more feasible and viable, because of the collective purchasing power, the bargaining power, more options in energy efficiency or storage, more flexibility and diversity in generating and consuming energy at different times, e.g. using PV to compensate day time consumption or for energy storage.

=== Household scale ===
In areas of Australia, more than 30% (2016) of households have rooftop photo-voltaic systems. It is useful for them to use free energy from the sun to reduce energy import from the grid. Further, demand side management can be helpful when a systematic approach is considered: the operation of photovoltaic, air conditioner, battery energy storage systems, storage water heaters, building performance and energy efficiency measures.

== Examples ==
=== Queensland, Australia ===
The utility companies in the state of Queensland, Australia have devices fitted onto certain household appliances such as air conditioners or into household meters to control water heater, pool pumps etc. These devices would allow energy companies to remotely cycle the use of these items during peak hours. Their plan also includes improving the efficiency of energy-using items and giving financial incentives to consumers who use electricity during off-peak hours, when it is less expensive for energy companies to produce.

Another example is that with demand side management, Southeast Queensland households can use electricity from rooftop photo-voltaic system to heat up water.

=== Toronto, Canada ===
In 2008, Toronto Hydro, the monopoly energy distributor of Ontario, had over 40,000 people signed up to have remote devices attached to air conditioners which energy companies use to offset spikes in demand. Spokeswoman Tanya Bruckmueller says that this program can reduce demand by 40 megawatts during emergency situations.

=== Indiana, US ===
The Alcoa Warrick Operation is participating in MISO as a qualified demand response resource, which means it is providing demand response in terms of energy, spinning reserve, and regulation service.

=== Brazil ===
Demand-side management can apply to electricity system based on thermal power plants or to systems where renewable energy, as hydroelectricity, is predominant but with a complementary thermal generation, for instance, in Brazil.

In Brazil's case, despite the generation of hydroelectric power corresponds to more than 80% of the total, to achieve a practical balance in the generation system, the energy generated by hydroelectric plants supplies the consumption below the peak demand. Peak generation is supplied by the use of fossil-fuel power plants. In 2008, Brazilian consumers paid more than U$1 billion for complementary thermoelectric generation not previously programmed.

In Brazil, the consumer pays for all the investment to provide energy, even if a plant sits idle. For most fossil-fuel thermal plants, the consumers pay for the "fuels" and other operation costs only when these plants generate energy. The energy, per unit generated, is more expensive from thermal plants than from hydroelectric. Only a few of the Brazilian's thermoelectric plants use natural gas, so they pollute significantly more than hydroelectric plants. The power generated to meet the peak demand has higher costs—both investment and operating costs—and the pollution has a significant environmental cost and potentially, financial and social liability for its use. Thus, the expansion and the operation of the current system is not as efficient as it could be using demand side management. The consequence of this inefficiency is an increase in energy tariffs that is passed on to the consumers.

Moreover, because electric energy is generated and consumed almost instantaneously, all the facilities, as transmission lines and distribution nets, are built for peak consumption. During the non-peak periods their full capacity is not utilized.

The reduction of peak consumption can benefit the efficiency of the electric systems, like the Brazilian system, in various ways: as deferring new investments in distribution and transmission networks, and reducing the necessity of complementary thermal power operation during peak periods, which can diminish both the payment for investment in new power plants to supply only during the peak period and the environmental impact associated with greenhouse gas emission.

== Issues ==
Some people argue that demand-side management has been ineffective because it has often resulted in higher utility costs for consumers and less profit for utilities.

One of the main goals of demand side management is to be able to charge the consumer based on the true price of the utilities at that time. If consumers could be charged less for using electricity during off-peak hours, and more during peak hours, then supply and demand would theoretically encourage the consumer to use less electricity during peak hours, thus achieving the main goal of demand side management.

== See also ==
- Alternative fuel
- Battery-to-grid
- Dynamic demand (electric power)
- Demand response
- Duck curve
- Energy conservation
- Energy intensity
- Energy storage as a service (ESaaS)
- Grid energy storage
- GridLAB-D
- List of energy storage projects
- Load profile
- Load management
- Time of Use
