= Enel X =

Italian utilities company established in 2017

- Industry: Energy; digitalization; sustainability; innovation; electrification
- Founded: 2017
- Founder: Enel S.p.A
- Headquarters: Rome, Italy
- Area served: Worldwide
- Key people: Francesca Gostinelli, CEO
- Products: Demand response; Energy procurement services; Electric mobility; Distributed energy resources; Energy storage solutions; Utility bill management
- Parent: Enel
- Website: corporate.enelx.com

Enel X Global Retail is a division of the Enel Group operating in the field of energy supply, energy management services, and public and private electric mobility. Its main office is in Rome.

== History ==
Enel X expanded its services by acquiring companies specialized in the digitization of energy services and by creating partnerships with companies from industries such as automotive, home automation, and ITC.

It also carries out activities in the field of electric mobility, leading to installing charging points throughout Italy. In July 2018, Enel X acquired 21% of Ufinet International, a platform in the ultra-broadband sector in Latin America. In the same period, Enel X expanded in the energy efficiency sector by acquiring Yousave. In October 2018, Enel X announced that its subsidiary EnerNOC, Inc. rebranded to Enel X. This operation was followed by acquiring Demand Energy (DEN) and eMotorWerks in the United States.

On 20 December 2018, Enel X and Infracapital signed a deal for energy efficiency projects for business customers. In September 2018, progress on the installation of new charging points in Italy were announced. In January 2019, Enel X became Poland’s 2021 - 2023 demand response leader, with a 70% share in the segment.

In June 2019 Enel X and FCA signed a partnership agreement for the development of electric vehicle projects. In October 2019 the company signed a partnership with Hyundai, comprising the possibility of recharging electric vehicles at Enel X public recharging infrastructures. The same occurred with other car manufacturers, such as Audi, PSA and Smart. In 2019, Enel X started the "Vivi Meglio" project, which was aimed at promoting energy efficiency, technical modernization, as well as to enhance safety standards in construction industry. In the same year, Homix was presented at the IBM Center in Milan. Homix integrates Alexa and allows a development of the concept of intelligent thermostat: it transforms, in fact, the device into a digital instrument that learns from domestic habits, in order to help manage consumption, safety and lighting at home. In January 2020, Enel X took part in the Consumer Electronics Show - CES in Las Vegas. At the end of October 2020, Enel X Pay was founded with the aim of expanding the ecosystem of solutions for physical and digital payment services. In the same period, the acquisition of Paytipper S.p.A. and Cityposte Payment was completed. In 2022, Enel X’s electric mobility services have been incorporated into Enel X Way, the Enel Group’s new global business line entirely dedicated to sustainable mobility. Its aim is to accelerate the development of the charging infrastructure for electric vehicles. In the same year, the Enel Group’s electricity and gas commodity sales activities went under the management of Enel X.

On 11 October 2024, the company ceased its electric mobility business in North America and Canada, which had been managed by its subsidiary Enel X Way USA. To manage the closure, a specialized third-party firm was appointed, responsible for handling remaining operations and communications with customers and partners. In addition, in November 2024, the Enel X Way USA charging network was entrusted to VoltiE Group Inc. to ensure service continuity and the operation of JuiceBox devices.

== Activities ==
Enel X Global Retail provides a range of modular and integrated products and services designed to meet customer needs while promoting electrification and digitalization. The company manages demand response services with a total capacity of 9.3 GW and has installed 10.7 MW of behind-the-meter storage, along with around 3 million light points worldwide. Additionally, it supplies energy to approximately 55 million customers on a daily basis. The Enel X Global Retail ecosystem of solutions is based on a platform business model that includes assets for optimizing and self-producing energy, premium energy efficiency and management solutions as well as competitive and flexible offers, with the aim of helping the customer to define their energy roadmap, accompanying them from the initial consultancy to the implementation of the solutions.

Enel X created an "Innovation & Product Lab", to develop and test new scalable products and services – often incorporating the input of startups, research centers, universities and customers – with a circular economy approach. Solutions and services for flexibility, like Demand Response, digital payment, adaptive public lighting systems and City Analytics are a direct result. At the end of 2021, from the development of these innovative projects, Enel X and Policlinico Universitario Agostino Gemelli IRCCS developed Smart Axistance e-Well, a telemedicine service with an app designed for companies.

== Awards ==
In 2017, Enel X won Corporate Art Award 2017 "for its ability to promote historical heritage and urban projects through artistic lighting". In 2018, it took the third place on the podium on the charging services Leaderboard drawn up by Navigant Research. In 2019, Enel X’s circular economy model took centre stage at EXCO 2019, an event which focused on international cooperation. In 2021 and 2022, Enel X has been named a market leader in the Energy as a Service Leaderboard report from Guidehouse Insights.
