= Utilization factor =

Measure of equipment use efficiency

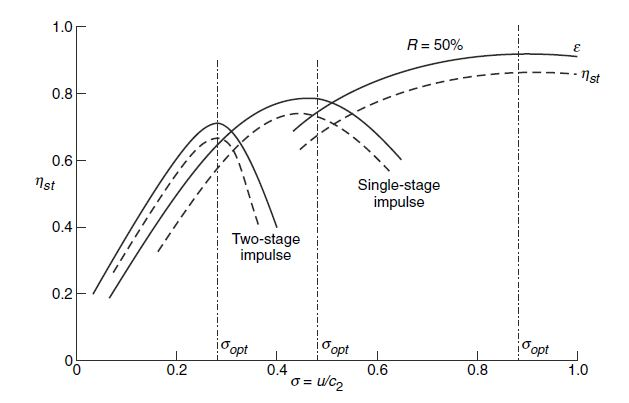
Utilization factor (solid line) with blade-to-gas speed ratio

The utilization factor or use factor is the ratio of the time that a piece of equipment is in use to the total time that it could be in use. It is often averaged over time in the definition such that the ratio becomes the amount of energy used divided by the maximum possible to be used. These definitions are equivalent.

The term is used in engineering such as mining, including areas of electrical engineering, such as photovoltaics.

== Electrical engineering ==
In electrical engineering, utilization factor, $k_\text{u}$, is the ratio of the maximum load which could be drawn to the rated capacity of the system. This is closely related to the concept of Load factor. The Load factor is the ratio of the load that a piece of equipment actually draws (time averaged) when it is in operation to the load it could draw (which we call full load).

For example, an oversized motor - 15 kW - drives a constant 12 kW load whenever it is on. The motor load factor is then 12/15 = 80%. The motor above may only be used for eight hours a day, 50 weeks a year. The hours of operation would then be 2800 hours, and the motor use factor for a base of 8760 hours per year would be 2800/8760 = 31.96%. With a base of 2800 hours per year, the motor use factor would be 100%.

== Other definitions ==
In offshore pipeline engineering, it is the ratio of the maximum allowable stress to the stress generally modelled at that section.

In power plant, utilization varies according to the demand on the plant from the electricity market.

== See also ==
- Capacity factor
- Demand factor
- Load factor
