= Escuelas Familiares Agrarias =

Agricultural Training Schools, in Spanish Escuelas de Formación Agraria (EFA) are specialised educational institutions that provide technical and professional training in areas related to agriculture, livestock, agribusiness, and the environment. These schools play a crucial role in training professionals for the agricultural and rural sector, combining theoretical and practical knowledge to address the challenges of rural areas.

== History ==
=== History in Spain ===
In Spain, the development of EFAs dates back to the 1960s when Joaquín Herreros and Felipe González de Canales launched the project for the first Escuelas Familiares Agrarias. Inspired by the model of the French Maison Familial Rural, they established the first two EFA, Molino Azul and Casablanquilla, in Lora del Río and Brenes (Seville) in 1967. These schools aimed to provide quality professional and cultural training to rural youth, preventing their migration to urban areas.

==== Relationship with Opus Dei ====
In their beginnings, some agricultural training schools (EFAs) in Spain were founded or managed by members of Opus Dei, as part of their educational and social work in various fields, including technical and agricultural training. However, over time, many of these institutions have diversified and may be managed by different educational entities, maintaining their focus on agricultural training without a specific religious affiliation.

Over time, the number of agricultural training schools (EFAs) in Spain has grown to around 40 institutions distributed across different regions of the country. These schools have evolved to adapt to changes in rural areas and educational legislation, offering especializad programs in agricultural and rural areas. The agricultural training schools in Spain continue to play a fundamental role in the development of rural areas. The diversification and adaptation of their educational offerings have transformed them into key centers for the training of highly qualified professionals in the agricultural and rural sector of the country.

Spain currently hosts twenty-seven institutions of this type, but this model has transcended borders, multiplying the presence of agricultural training schools (EFA) worldwide. This expansion has generated a wide range of specialization possibilities, significantly expanding the educational offerings. Beyond traditional courses in agricultural management, livestock, and forestry, EFAs now cover diverse areas such as viticulture, restoration, natural resource management and organization, livestock production, automotive, hospitality, tourism, early childhood education, social healthcare, nursing auxiliary care, and oral hygiene. There are more than 40 EFAs that have existed in Spain:

In the Spanish context, agricultural training schools (EFAs) are grouped into different regional federations, such as Western Andalusia, Eastern Andalusia, Aragon, Castilla La Mancha-Madrid, Catalonia, Extremadura, Galicia, and Valencia. In 1978, the majority of these institutions decided to come together to form the National Union of Agricultural Training Schools (UNEFA), which currently brings together the majority of professional training and rural development centers in Spain. Spanish Agricultural Training Schools (EFAs) have an association of 50,000 alumni, and currently, about 6,000 students are enrolled in them.

=== History in other parts of the world ===
On a global scale, UNEFA is part of the International Association, Maison Familiale Rurale (AIMFR), an international organization with 353 affiliated schools in Latin America, 129 in Africa, 6 in Asia, and 531 in Europe. It also engages with bodies such as the Confederation of Family Organizations of the European Union (COFACE), providing guidance to new agricultural training schools (EFAs) in America and contributing to awareness and assistance efforts in developing countries.
