= Peak demand =

Highest power demand on a grid in a specified period

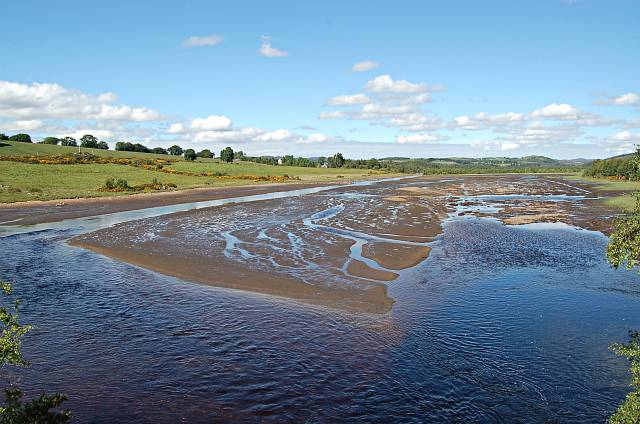
Loch Mhor is used to generate hydro-electric energy at peak demand or in an emergency

Peak demand on an electrical grid is the highest electrical power demand that has occurred over a specified time period. Peak demand is typically characterized as annual, daily or seasonal and has the unit of power. Peak demand, peak load or on-peak are terms used in energy demand management describing a period in which electrical power is expected to be provided for a sustained period at a significantly higher than average supply level. Peak demand fluctuations occur on daily, monthly, seasonal, and yearly cycles. For an electric utility company, the actual point of peak demand is a single period that represents the highest point of customer consumption of electricity, typically when a combination of industrial, commercial, and domestic consumers are using heavy heating or cooling loads. The cost of generating and supplying electricity is also typically highest at peak load periods, as more power plants must be operating at high capacity.

Some utilities will charge customers based on their individual peak demand. The highest demand during each month or even a single 15 to 30 minute period of highest use in the previous year may be used to calculate charges. The renewable energy transition will include considerations for peak demand.

== Demand Tariff ==
Electricity network is built to deal with the highest possible peak demand otherwise blackout may happen. In Australia, demand tariff has three components: peak demand charge, energy charge and daily connection charge. For example, for large customers (commercial, industrial or a mix of commercial and residential), the peak demand charge is based on the highest 30 minutes electricity consumption in a month; the energy charge is based on a month's electricity consumption. This type of demand tariff is gradually introduced to residential households and will be rolled out by 2020 in Queensland, Australia. How to manage electricity bills under demand tariff can be challenging. The key solutions involve improving building efficiency and managing the operational settings of large power appliances.

== Time of Peak Demand ==
Peak Demand depends on the demography, the economy, the weather, the climate, the season, the day of the week and other factors. In industrialised regions of China or Germany, the peak demands mostly occur in day time. However, in more service based economy such as Australia, the daily peak demands often occur in the late afternoon to early evening time (e.g. 4pm to 8pm). Residential and commercial electricity demand contributes a lot to this type of network peak demand.

== Off-peak ==
Peak demand is considered to be the opposite to off-peak hours when power demand is usually low. There are off-peak time-of-use rates. Sometimes, there are 3 time-of-use zones: peak, shoulder and offpeak. Shoulder is often the time between peak and offpeak in weekdays. Weekends are often just peak and offpeak in terms of managing electricity loads for the network.

== Response ==
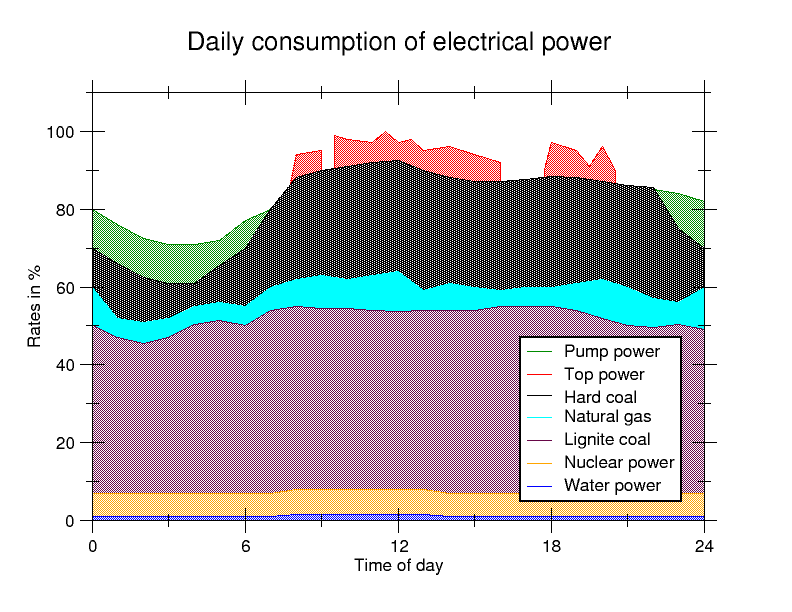
Typical daily consumption of electrical power in Germany, outdated (2005)

Peak demand may exceed the maximum supply levels that the electrical power industry can generate, resulting in power outages and load shedding. This often occurs during heat waves when use of air conditioners and powered fans raises the rate of energy consumption significantly. During a shortage authorities may request the public to curtail their energy use and shift it to a non-peak period.

== Power stations ==
Power stations specifically constructed for providing power to electrical grids for peak demand are called peaking power plants or 'peakers'. In general, Natural gas fueled power stations can be fired up rapidly and are therefore often utilized at peak demand times. Combined cycle power plants can frequently provide power for peak demand, as well as run efficiently for baseload power.

Hydroelectric power and pumped storage type dams such as Carters Dam in the U.S. state of Georgia help to meet peak demand as well.

The chances that a wind farm will be unable to meet peak demand are greater than for a fossil-fueled power station, due to the ability to store liquid fuels for use during peak demand.

Solar power's peak output often naturally coincides with daytime peaks of usage due to air conditioning.

== See also ==
- Congestion pricing
- Diversity factor
- Merit order
- Electricity market
- Energy storage
- List of energy storage projects
- Peak oil
- Price elasticity of demand
- V2G
