= Mordey-Fricker electricity meter =

Electricity meter patented in the UK in 1902

The Mordey-Fricker electricity meter was an electricity meter patented in the United Kingdom in 1902 by William Morris Mordey and Guy Carey Fricker. It was notable for being suitable for both direct current and alternating current supply systems, and for differing in principle and mode of action from any other meter in use at the time. It was manufactured by the British Insulated Wire Company for the Mordey-Fricker Electricity Meter Company, Limited, of Grosvenor Mansions, Victoria Street, London.

== Design and operation ==
The meter was described at the time of its introduction as a combination of an ordinary clock with a galvanometer coil. Its construction differed fundamentally from the induction disk meters that had become standard for AC supply following the work of Ottó Bláthy (1889) and Oliver Shallenberger (1894).

The mechanism consisted of an American clock movement deprived of its hair-spring, with a disc of slate mounted on the balance wheel shaft. Pieces of iron wire or iron strip were fixed to the disc in the manner of a compass card. This disc was surrounded by a fixed coil of wire conveying the current to be metered. The disc acted as a variable hair-spring: the iron it carried was magnetised more or less strongly by the current, creating a directive action tending to bring the iron towards a central or axial position within the coil. This action, combined with the driving spring of the clock, caused the disc to oscillate at a rate directly proportional to the current. The effect was equivalent to augmenting the force of gravity on a pendulum without changing its mass.

When no current was passing, there was no directive action on the iron and the disc came to rest at one or other extreme of its arc of oscillation, so the meter stopped completely and recorded nothing.

The balance wheel shaft was carried on a footstep jewel, with a torsionless silk fibre suspension attached to the shaft by a bent wire spring to relieve the jewel of pressure and prevent damage from long-continued use.

== Key features ==
The meter was an ampere-hour meter, but for use on constant pressure circuits the counter geared to the clock was arranged to indicate consumption directly in kilowatt-hours or Board of Trade units.

An important feature was that with alternating currents there was no frequency error: the constant was the same for all practical frequencies, which distinguished it from some contemporary AC meters.

The meters were designed especially for small installations of lamps, typically twelve to thirty lamps, and were made to record the smallest loads met with in practice, including a single 5 or 8 candle-power lamp. The pressure drop due to the resistance of the coil was approximately 0.7 per cent on full load.

One winding of the clockwork was sufficient to last approximately three months on typical small installations, coinciding with standard meter inspection intervals.

Two sizes were exhibited at the Royal Society conversazione on 14 May 1902: a 20-light and a 10-light meter.

== Development ==
Mordey and Fricker began their collaboration on electricity metering in 1900, when they filed their first joint patent on "Improvements in Electricity Meters". Several further patents followed before the definitive Mordey-Fricker meter was patented in 1902. The meter was demonstrated at the Royal Society in May 1902 and described in an illustrated article in The Engineer on 30 May 1902.

Guy Carey Fricker had prior experience in electrical work, having provided electric illumination for the fountains at the Earls Court Industrial Exhibition in 1894. Mordey was at the time operating as a consulting engineer from a Victoria Street address, following his departure from the Brush Electrical Engineering Company in 1897.

== Context ==
The Mordey-Fricker meter arrived during a period of rapid development in AC electricity metering. The first AC kilowatt-hour meter had been patented by the Hungarian engineer Ottó Bláthy and exhibited by the Ganz Works in 1889. Oliver Shallenberger of the Westinghouse Electric Corporation had applied the induction disk principle to produce a watt-hour meter in 1894. By 1902, AC electricity supply was well established in Britain, with Mordey's own alternators having powered many of the pioneer power stations, creating a growing need for accurate domestic metering of small installations.

The meter's ability to operate on both direct and alternating current without frequency error was a significant advantage in an era when supply systems were not yet standardised.

== Sources ==
- "The Mordey-Fricker Electricity Meter". The Engineer: 546. 30 May 1902.
- "William Morris Mordey". Grace's Guide.
- "Mordey-Fricker Electricity Meter Co". Grace's Guide.
- "Guy Carey Fricker". Grace's Guide.

== See also ==
- William Morris Mordey
- Mordey alternator
- Electricity meter
- Ottó Bláthy
- Brush Electrical Engineering Company
