= Equaliser (electrical) =

Device for eliminating circulating currents in parallel armature windings

In electrical engineering, an equaliser (also spelled equalizer) is a device used to eliminate or reduce circulating currents in electrical machines whose armature windings are arranged in two or more parallel portions. When the parallel portions of an armature are not perfectly equal due to manufacturing tolerances, unequal magnetic flux, or asymmetric construction, a potential difference arises between them, causing circulating currents to flow within the winding.

These circulating currents waste power as heat and reduce the efficiency of the machine. The equaliser suppresses them by opposing any tendency for one portion of the winding to carry more current than another.

The device was first described and named by William Morris Mordey in a paper presented to the Institution of Electrical Engineers on 23 February 1893.

== Mordey's equaliser ==
Mordey described the problem and its solution in his 1893 IEE paper "On Testing and Working Alternators." In alternators whose armatures were wound in two or more parallel portions, he found that unless the portions were perfectly equal and simultaneously acted upon by the magnetic field, circulating currents would flow between them, wasting power and creating unequal loading of the winding sections.

His solution was a transformer-based device consisting of a pair of similar coils wound in the manner of a transformer, with one coil placed in series with each half of the armature circuit. Under normal conditions, with equal currents flowing from both portions, the two coils carry equal and opposite magnetising forces, no net magnetic flux is induced in the core, and the device is electrically invisible, presenting no impedance to the circuit.

If one portion of the armature begins to supply a larger current than the other, the equaliser acts as a transformer, opposing an electromotive force (EMF) in the circuit carrying excess current and adding a corresponding EMF to the circuit of lower voltage, thus restoring balance automatically.

Mordey demonstrated the device on a 250 kilowatt, 2,000 volt alternator whose two armature halves were so unequal that 16 amperes of circulating current flowed between them without the equaliser. The addition of a small equaliser reduced this circulating current to half an ampere. He stated that the Brush Electrical Engineering Company subsequently applied the equaliser to "all the larger machines."

== Principle of operation ==
The equaliser operates on the same principle as a transformer. The two coils share a common magnetic core. When the currents in the two armature portions are equal, the magnetomotive forces of the two coils cancel and no flux is induced, so the device draws no power and has no effect on the circuit.

When an imbalance develops, the resulting net magnetomotive force induces a flux in the core, which in turn induces an EMF that opposes the imbalance. The device acts as a self-regulating feedback mechanism, continuously correcting any tendency toward unequal current distribution without requiring external intervention.

== Equaliser rings in DC machines ==
A related but distinct device, the equaliser ring (also called an equalising connection), is used in direct current machines with lap-wound armatures. In a multipolar lap-wound DC machine, the armature has as many parallel paths as there are poles. Ideally all parallel paths generate the same EMF, but in practice small differences in air gap, pole flux, or winding resistance cause potential differences between points that should be at equal potential.

Equaliser rings are low-resistance conductors connecting points in the armature winding that are theoretically at the same potential, typically points two pole-pitches apart. They allow circulating currents to flow through the equaliser rings rather than through the brushes, preventing brush overloading and sparking.

Equaliser rings are required in lap windings but not in wave-wound armatures, because wave windings inherently have only two parallel paths regardless of the number of poles, and the potential differences that drive circulating currents do not arise in the same way.

== Sources ==
- Mordey, W.M. (1893). "On Testing and Working Alternators". Journal of the Institution of Electrical Engineers. 22: 110–134. doi:10.1049/jiee-1.1893.0004.
- Nasar, S.A. (1987). Electric Machines and Transformers. New York: Macmillan. ISBN 978-0023856303.
- "William Morris Mordey". Grace's Guide.

== See also ==
- William Morris Mordey
- Mordey alternator
- Armature (electrical)
- Transformer
- Lap winding
