= ANSI C12.20 =

ANSI C12.20 is an ANSI standard that describes an American National Standard for Electricity Meters—accuracy and performance.

The C12.20 standard established the physical aspects and performance criteria for a meter's accuracy class. It refines certain details in ANSI C12.1 and ANSI C12.10.

The existing ANSI accuracy classes for electric meters are:

- Class .5: having ± 0.5% accuracy.
- Class .2: having ± 0.2% accuracy.
- Class .1: having ± 0.1% accuracy.

Outside North America, IEC standards are used for electric meters.

== See also ==
- Electricity meter
