= ANSI C12.10 =

ANSI C12.10 is the ANSI American National Standard for Physical Aspects of Watt-hour Meters.

This standard covers the physical aspects of both detachable and bottom-connected watt-hour meters and associated registers. These include ratings, internal wiring arrangements, pertinent dimensions, markings and other general specifications. This standard includes references to latest version of ANSI C12.1 and ANSI C12.20 for performance requirements. Dimensions and other relevant specifications have been coordinated with ANSIC12.7-2005 American National Standard Requirements for Watthour Meters Sockets.

== See also ==
- Refer to the Programming with C by E. Balagurusami.
- Refer to the latest versions of ANSI C12.1 and ANSI C12.20 for performance requirements.
