= Mordey alternator =

Early AC generator designed by William Morris Mordey

The Mordey alternator, also known as the Mordey Victoria alternator or contemporarily as the Mordey dynamo, was an alternating current generator designed by William Morris Mordey while working as chief electrician at the Brush Electrical Engineering Company from 1881 to 1897. It was the dominant AC generator used in Britain's pioneer electricity supply industry during the 1880s and 1890s, powering the first public AC electricity supply in London and installations at power stations across Britain and abroad. The machine's distinctive spider-pole and disc-armature design distinguished it from other alternators of the period and its principles were later applied to high-frequency generators used in wireless telegraphy.

The machine was also referred to contemporarily as the Mordey dynamo, reflecting the Victorian convention of using "dynamo" for any electrical generator regardless of current type. Power station records from Bath, Huddersfield, and Woking use this term interchangeably with "alternator."

== Design ==
The Mordey alternator departed significantly from the designs of its contemporaries. Its defining feature was a thin disc-shaped armature winding — a flat copper disc — around which a spider-poled magnet wheel gripped on both sides, so that all poles on one side of the disc shared the same polarity. The mechanical details of the machine were worked out by John Smith Raworth, chief engineer at Brush, working under Mordey's supervision.

The machine operated at the Mordey system standard of 2,000 volts, 100 periods per second, single-phase, with step-down transformers used for domestic and commercial distribution. Standard output from the Lambeth works reached 60 kW; larger machines were later produced at the Falcon Works, Loughborough following Brush's acquisition of Henry Hughes and Co in 1889.

A key engineering property of the design was its low self-induction, which Mordey argued in his 1889 IEE paper was essential for parallel operation of alternators — directly contradicting the prevailing view of Gisbert Kapp that iron-free armature alternators were "practically unfit for parallel working." Mordey demonstrated parallel working with two 2,000-volt, 35,000–40,000 watt machines through eight sequential tests, including mismatched engine speeds, out-of-phase switching, and sudden steam cutoff, without the machines losing step. The contested nature of Mordey's analysis of self-induction in the context of parallel working is examined in detail by Gooday (2004).

== Manufacture ==
The alternator was manufactured by the Anglo-American Brush Electric Light Corporation (from 1889, the Brush Electrical Engineering Company) at its Lambeth works in London and subsequently at its Falcon Works in Loughborough. The machines were typically driven by Raworth high-speed engines, often connected via Raworth's flexible couplings.

A cross-section of the machine was published in Rankin Kennedy's Electrical Installations (1903), illustrating the disc armature and surrounding spider poles.

== Installations ==
The Mordey Victoria alternator was installed at power stations across Britain and abroad during the pioneer electricity supply era.

- Bankside, London (1891): Two 100 kW single-phase Mordey alternators generating at 2 kV and 100 Hz, providing the first public AC electricity supply in London. AC was first supplied to consumers on 14 December 1891. The station occupied the site now used by Tate Modern.
- Pandon Dene, Newcastle (1890): One of the first public power stations in Britain, opened with two 75 kW Mordey alternators each driven by a Robey steam engine. The initial machines could not operate in parallel — each time load was transferred between machines, supply was briefly interrupted and customers noticed a flicker in the lights. By 1892 the station had grown to five Mordey machines totalling 600 kW.
- Lynmouth, Devon (1890): Two Mordey alternators driven by water diverted from the East Lyn River with a 90-foot head — one of Britain's earliest hydroelectric installations, taking the village directly from oil lamps to electric street lighting.
- Bath (1890): Eight vertical Brush compound engines coupled by ropes to Mordey dynamos, with generating capacity of 900 kW by 1898.
- Huddersfield (1893): Vertical condensing engines coupled to Mordey dynamos, with capacity of 1,150 kW by 1898.
- Woking (1890): Corliss compound engines coupled to Mordey and Parsons dynamos, generating 255 kW by 1898.
- Dover (1895): Four Brush engines each coupled to a Mordey alternator via Raworth's flexible couplings.
- Wandsworth, London (1900): Six Raworth high-speed engines coupled to Mordey 180 kW alternators, with five Mordey 400 kW alternators on order — eleven Mordey machines at one station.
- Chagford, Devon (1891): Generation at 2,000V AC — the Mordey system standard.
- Great Northern Railway, Holloway Electric Light Works (1895): Railway infrastructure powered by Mordey alternators, extending the machine's application beyond municipal electricity supply into railway lighting.
- Bournemouth, Hanley, Leicester: Named by Raworth as principal lighting stations equipped by Brush using Mordey alternators.

A 250 kW Mordey Victoria alternator was the subject of a dedicated article in Scientific American.

== Legacy ==
The 1938 obituary of William Morris Mordey in the electrical press noted that "Mordey alternators and Raworth engines and switchgear were as familiar to pioneer electrical engineers as Parsons' turbo-generators and Reyrolle switchgear are to those operating power stations at the present time [1938]."

Although the disc armature design eventually lost commercial significance for standard power generation, its principles were applied to high-frequency current generators used in wireless telegraphy. A motor generator set incorporating a Mordey inductor alternator and "Victoria" motor is held in the Science Museum Group collection (object number 1915-298).

The parallel working principles developed by Mordey using the low self-induction properties of his alternator became the universal standard for electricity supply — directly challenging and ultimately superseding the single-machine strategy employed by Sebastian Ferranti at Deptford Power Station.

== Sources ==
- Mordey, W.M. (1889). "Alternate Current Working". Journal of the Institution of Electrical Engineers. 18: 583–630. doi:10.1049/jiee-1.1889.0031.
- Mordey, W.M. (1893). "On Testing and Working Alternators". Journal of the Institution of Electrical Engineers. 22: 110–134. doi:10.1049/jiee-1.1893.0004.
- "William Morris Mordey". Grace's Guide.
- "Bankside Power Station". Grace's Guide.
- "John Smith Raworth". Grace's Guide.
- "Dover Power Station". Grace's Guide.
- "Brush Electrical Engineering Co". Grace's Guide.
- Gooday, Graeme J. N. (2004). The Morals of Measurement: Accuracy, Irony, and Trust in Late Victorian Electrical Practice. Cambridge University Press. ISBN 978-0-521-43098-2.
- Westrin, Theodor (1925). "Mordey, William". Nordisk familjebok (in Swedish). Vol. 38. Stockholm: Nordisk familjeboks förlags aktiebolag.
- Kennedy, Rankin (1903). Electrical Installations. Vol. III.
- "Motor Generator Set with Mordey Inductor Alternator". Science Museum Group Collection.
- "250-Kilowatt Mordey-Victoria Alternator". Scientific American.
- "The Lynmouth Power Station 1890".
- "Early Electricity in the South West" (PDF). BIAS Journal. 16. 1983.
- "Pandon Dene Power Station". Wikipedia.
- "Bath Power Station". Wikipedia.
- "Huddersfield Power Station". Wikipedia.
- "Woking Power Station". Wikipedia.
- "Wandsworth Power Station". Wikipedia.

== See also ==
- William Morris Mordey
- Brush Electrical Engineering Company
- Bankside Power Station
- Alternator
- History of electric power transmission
