= V curve =

Electromechanical function

V curve for a synchronous motor. The horizontal axis shows field current, the vertical axis shows armature current. The minimum point of each curve corresponds to unity power factor.

In synchronous machines, the V curve (also spelled as V-curve) is the graph showing the relation of armature current as a function of field current in synchronous motors keeping the load constant. The name comes from an observation made by W. M. Mordey in 1893 that the curve resembles a letter V.

The V curve was first published in Mordey's paper "On Testing and Working Alternators," presented to the Institution of Electrical Engineers on 23 February 1893, chaired by W.H. Preece FRS. The paper contained several original contributions to electrical engineering, including the first codified system of principles for the parallel operation of alternators, the first description and naming of the equaliser device, and an original methodology for testing large alternators at full electrical load.

The lowest point of the curve corresponds to the unity power factor. For a motor, points on the left of the minimum correspond to underexcitation (and therefore the armature current would "lag" the voltage), on the right to overexcitation (and "lead"). Typically multiple V curves are plotted based on experiments, each corresponding to its own load value.

The minimum at unity power factor ($\cos \phi$) is due to the general formula for the power P of a synchronous motor, $P = \sqrt 3 V_A I_A \cos \phi$. In order to keep the power constant, with the line voltage at the terminals of the armature $V_A$ also constant, any decrease in power factor has to be accommodated by a corresponding increase in the armature current $I_A$. At the low values of the field current, the power factor is low, so the armature current is high (and lagging). As the field current increases, the power factor increases too, until the unity power factor is reached (the armature current decreases to its minimum when the motor reaches this normal excitation). If the field current is increased beyond this point, the armature current becomes leading, power factor decreases, and $I_A$ grows again.

The data from the V curves can be used to set up the synchronous motor to correct the power factor of the overall system, as the power factor of the motor can be changed by simply adjusting the field current. This made the V curve a practical tool for managing early electricity supply networks, where maintaining power factor across multiple installations was a significant operational challenge. While performing the correction, the motor can either provide mechanical power also, or run in idle mode ("float"), working as a synchronous condenser.

== Inverted V curve ==
The inverted V curve is a graph showing the relation of power factor as a function of field current. The shape of this curve resembles a dome.

== See also ==
- Synchronous motor
- William Morris Mordey
- Power factor correction

== Sources ==
- Mordey, W.M. (1893). "On Testing and Working Alternators" (PDF). Journal of the Institution of Electrical Engineers. 22: 110–134. doi:10.1049/jiee-1.1893.0004.
- Dawes, C.L. (1916). Jameson, J. M. (ed.). Electrical Measurements and Testing, Direct and Alternating Current. The Wiley technical series. J. Wiley & sons, Incorporated.
- M.I.E.E. (1906). "The Electric Transmission of Power". English Mechanics and the World of Science. 83. E. J. Kibblewhite: 590–592.
- Dawes, C.L. (1922). A Course in Electrical Engineering: Alternating currents. A Course in Electrical Engineering. McGraw-Hill Book Company, Incorporated.
- Saadat, Hadi. 2004. Power Systems Analysis. 2nd Ed. McGraw Hill. International Edition. ISBN 978-0-07-128184-3.
