= John Smith Raworth =

British electrical engineer

- Born: 1846
- Died: 1917 (aged 70–71)
- Occupation: Electrical engineer
- Known for: Raworth engine Regenerative control for tramway systems First electrically worked lift in Britain; Pioneer electricity supply installations
- Engineering career
- Employer(s): Brush Electrical Engineering Company; British Electric Traction Company

John Smith Raworth (1846 to 1917), known to colleagues as "J.S.R.", was a British electrical engineer who served as chief engineer of the Brush Electrical Engineering Company from 1886, working alongside chief electrician William Morris Mordey to establish the dominant AC electricity supply system of Britain's pioneer electricity age.

== Early career in Manchester ==
Before joining Brush, Raworth worked in Manchester where he established a small works and built a substantial reputation in electrical engineering. He was responsible for fitting up the electrical equipment of several major ocean liners including the Alaska, Arizona, Aurania, Austral, Britannic, City of Berlin, City of Rome, and Orient.

Beyond marine work, Raworth was responsible for erecting the majority of the more important electric lighting plants put to work during that period in the Manchester area. He is recorded as having installed the first electrically worked lift to be operated in Britain. He also started and operated a small central generating station from which he distributed current to consumers in the immediate neighbourhood, one of the earliest examples of local electricity distribution in the country.

When Raworth left Manchester, Mr. Dorman and Mr. Smith took over the small works he had established, which eventually became Dorman and Smith Ltd, a significant electrical engineering manufacturer in its own right.

== Brush Electrical Engineering Company: 1886 to 1897 ==
In 1886 Raworth came to London to take up the position of chief engineer at what was then the Anglo-American Brush Electric Light Corporation, later the Brush Electrical Engineering Company, operating from Victoria Works, Belvedere Road, Lambeth.

With Raworth as chief engineer and William Morris Mordey as chief electrician, the company entered a new era. The design of pre-existing machines was drastically revised and improvements in dynamo design began to appear, all embodying greater mechanical strength. A large portion of the company's business at this time, owing to Raworth's earlier connections, was in combined ship lighting plants.

Raworth designed a special type of high speed engine specifically for use with the Mordey alternator, which became the standard prime mover paired with the Mordey Victoria alternator across every Brush installation and was universally known as the Raworth engine.

=== The Mordey-Raworth parallel working system ===
Raworth was co-developer with Mordey of the six-principle system for the parallel operation of alternators. Mordey described in his 1893 IEE paper how the principles had been settled between them years earlier and had been "acted on ever since, practically without change" across every Brush installation. This system formed the operational framework for how public electricity supply networks were operated and was a foundational contribution to the development of the modern electricity grid.

=== Power station installations ===
The principal lighting stations equipped by the Brush Company under Raworth's direction included the Bankside Power Station of the City of London Electric Lighting Company, which provided the first public AC electricity supply in London in 1891, and stations at Bournemouth, Hanley, Huddersfield, Leicester, Bath, Dover, Woking, Wandsworth, Lynmouth and Pandon Dene, Newcastle.

To accommodate the growing scale of operations, the largest machine normally made at Victoria Works having an output of only 60 kilowatts, the company acquired the Falcon Works at Loughborough and equipped them for the manufacture and full-load testing of larger electrical machinery.

== Later career ==
After leaving Brush, Raworth established himself as a consulting engineer in Westminster, specialising in electric traction, a subject which had always interested him. He had previously served as technical adviser to the British Electric Traction Company and subsequently became its technical director.

One of his first works after commencing independent practice was to perfect and introduce his system of regenerative control for tramway systems, which allowed trams to recover energy during braking. He was also responsible for several further lighting and power systems.

== Character and reputation ==
Raworth was known to colleagues throughout his career at Brush as "J.S.R." His Grace's Guide obituary recorded that he would be missed by a wide circle of friends and by none more so than those who worked under him, to whom he was always a considerate and just superior officer who, though he got a great deal of work out of those in subordinate positions, never treated them with anything but marked courtesy.

== Death ==
John Smith Raworth died in 1917.

== Sources ==
- "John Smith Raworth". Grace's Guide.
- "Anglo-American Brush Electric Light Corporation". Grace's Guide.
- "Dorman and Smith". Grace's Guide.
- "Brush Electrical Engineering Company". Grace's Guide.
- Mordey, W.M. (1893). "On Testing and Working Alternators". Journal of the Institution of Electrical Engineers. 22: 110–134. doi:10.1049/jiee-1.1893.0004.
