= Blondel's theorem =

Result in electrical engineering

Blondel's theorem, named after its discoverer, French electrical engineer André Blondel, is the result of his attempt to simplify both the measurement of electrical energy and the validation of such measurements.

The result is a simple rule that specifies the minimum number of watt-hour meters required to measure the consumption of energy in any system of electrical conductors.

The theorem states that the power provided to a system of N conductors is equal to the algebraic sum of the power measured by N watt-meters. The N watt-meters are separately connected such that each one measures the current level in one of the N conductors and the potential level between that conductor and a common point. In a further simplification, if that common point is located on one of the conductors, that conductor's meter can be removed and only N-1 meters are required. An electrical energy meter is a watt-meter whose measurements are integrated over time, thus the theorem applies to watt-hour meters as well. Blondel wrote a paper on his results that was delivered to the International Electric Congress held in Chicago in 1893. Although he was not present at the Congress, his paper is included in the published Proceedings.

Instead of using N-1 separate meters, the meters are combined into a single housing for commercial purposes such as measuring energy delivered to homes and businesses. Each pairing of a current measuring unit plus a potential measuring unit is then termed a stator or element. Thus, for example, a meter for a four wire service will include three elements. Blondel's Theorem simplifies the work of an electrical utility worker by specifying that an N wire service will be correctly measured by a N-1 element meter. Unfortunately, confusion arises for such workers due to the existence of meters that don't contain tidy pairings of single potential measuring units with single current measuring units. For example, a meter was previously used for four wire services containing two potential coils and three current coils and called a 2.5 element meter.

== Blondel Noncompliance ==
Electric energy meters that meet the requirement of N-1 elements for an N wire service are often said to be Blondel Compliant. This label identifies the meter as one that will measure correctly under all conditions when correctly installed. However, a meter doesn't have to be Blondel compliant in order to provide suitably accurate measurements and industry practice often includes the use of such non compliant meters. The form 2S meter is extensively used in the metering of residential three wire services, despite being non compliant in such services. This common residential service consists of two 120 volt wires and one neutral wire. A Blondel compliant meter for such a service would need two elements (and a five jaw socket to accept such a meter), but the 2S meter is a single element meter. The 2S meter includes one potential measuring device (a coil or a voltmeter) and two current measuring devices. The current measuring devices provide a measurement equal to one half of the actual current value. The combination of a single potential coil and two so called half coils provides highly accurate metering under most conditions. The meter has been used since the early days of the electrical industry. The advantages were the lower cost of a single potential coil and the avoidance of interference between two elements driving a single disc in an induction meter. For line to line loads, the meter is Blondel compliant. Such loads are two wire loads and a single element meter suffices. The non compliance of the meter occurs in measuring line to neutral loads. The meter design approximates a two element measurement by combining a half current value with the potential value of the line to line connection. The line to line potential is exactly twice the line to neutral connection if the two line to neutral connections are exactly balanced. Twice the potential times half the current then approximates the actual power value with equality under balanced potential. In the case of line to line loads, two times the half current value times the potential value equals the actual power. Error is introduced if the two line to neutral potentials are not balanced and if the line to neutral loads are not equally distributed. That error is given by 0.5(V1-V2)(I1-I2) where V1 and I1 are the potential and current connected between one line and neutral and V2 and I2 are those connected between the other line and neutral. Since the industry typically maintains five percent accuracy in potential, the error will be acceptably low if the loads aren't heavily unbalanced.

This same meter has been modified or installed in modified sockets and used for two wire, 120 volt services (relabeled as 2W on the meter face). The modification places the two half coils in series such that a full coil is created. In such installations, the single element meter is Blondel compliant. There is also a three wire 240/480 volt version that is not Blondel compliant. Also in use are three phase meters that are not Blondel compliant, such as forms 14S and 15S, but they can be easily replaced by modern meters and can be considered obsolete.

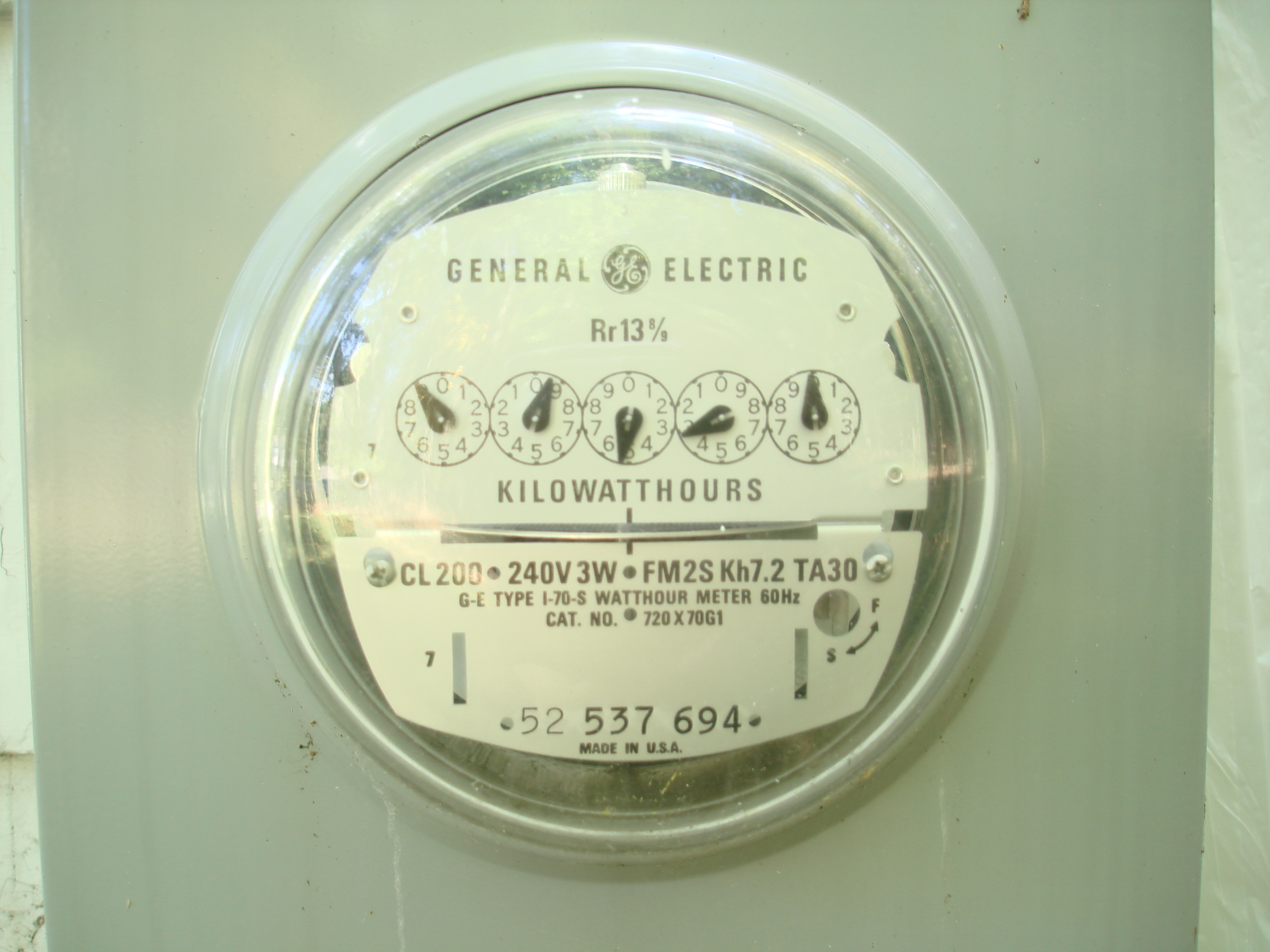
A form 2S watt-hour meter used for single phase 120-240 volt, 3 wire systems. It is a single element energy meter.
