= ANSI C12.1 =

ANSI C12.1 is the American National Standard for Code for Electricity Metering

This standard establishes acceptable performance criteria for new types of AC watthour meters, demand meters, demand registers, pulse devices and auxiliary devices. It describes acceptable in-service performance levels for meters and devices used in revenue metering.
