= William Ayrton =

William Ayrton may refer to:

- William Edward Ayrton (1847–1908), English physicist and electrical engineer
- William Ayrton (music critic) (1777–1858), English musical writer
