= Accuracy class =

Accuracy classes are defined and used in IEC and ANSI standards. Classes are denoted by either a letter or percentage. For example, Class B is a temperature accuracy from IEC-751 that requires accuracy of ± 0.15 degrees Celsius. Class 0.5 is an ANSI C12.20 accuracy class for electric meters with absolute accuracy better than ± 0.5% of the nominal full scale reading.

Typically, a class specifies accuracy at a number of points, with the absolute accuracy at lower values being better than the nominal "percentage of full scale" accuracy.

Accuracy classes such as IEC's 0.15s are a 'special' high accuracy class.

Calculation for accuracy of class 1 meter:
1600 impulse/KWh and 
considering, P.F= 1 and LOAD = 100w
Revolution time, 
Rt = (3600×Kh×1)/Load(w) [Kh = 1000/(impulse/Kwh=1600)]
Rt = (3600×0.625×1)/100
Rt = 22.5sec [Standard]

%of error = (Ft-Rt)/Rt

The positive or negative result indicates whether the meter is fast or slow. If the result is positive, then the meter is fast, while negative means the meter is slow.
