= Douglas Greenwald =

American economist (1913–1997)

Douglas M. Greenwald (June 5, 1913, Manhattan – January 15, 1997, Sarasota) was an economist. He was among the National Association of Business Economists. In 1965, he was elected as a Fellow of the American Statistical Association.

== Education ==
He earned a bachelor's degree in economics from Temple University and his master's and Ph.D. in economics from George Washington University.

== Career ==
Greenwald joined McGraw-Hill for in 1947 as a staff economist in the magazine division, retiring in 1978 as vice president for economics of the McGraw-Hill Publications Company. In retirement he was an adviser to Japanese executives and government officials as well as editor of the last two editions of the economics encyclopedia. He also wrote and edited seven books and edited the McGraw-Hill Dictionary of Modern Economics.

== Awards ==
Japan awarded Greenwald the Third Class of the Order of the Sacred Treasure in 1986.
