= William Morris Mordey =

British electrical engineer

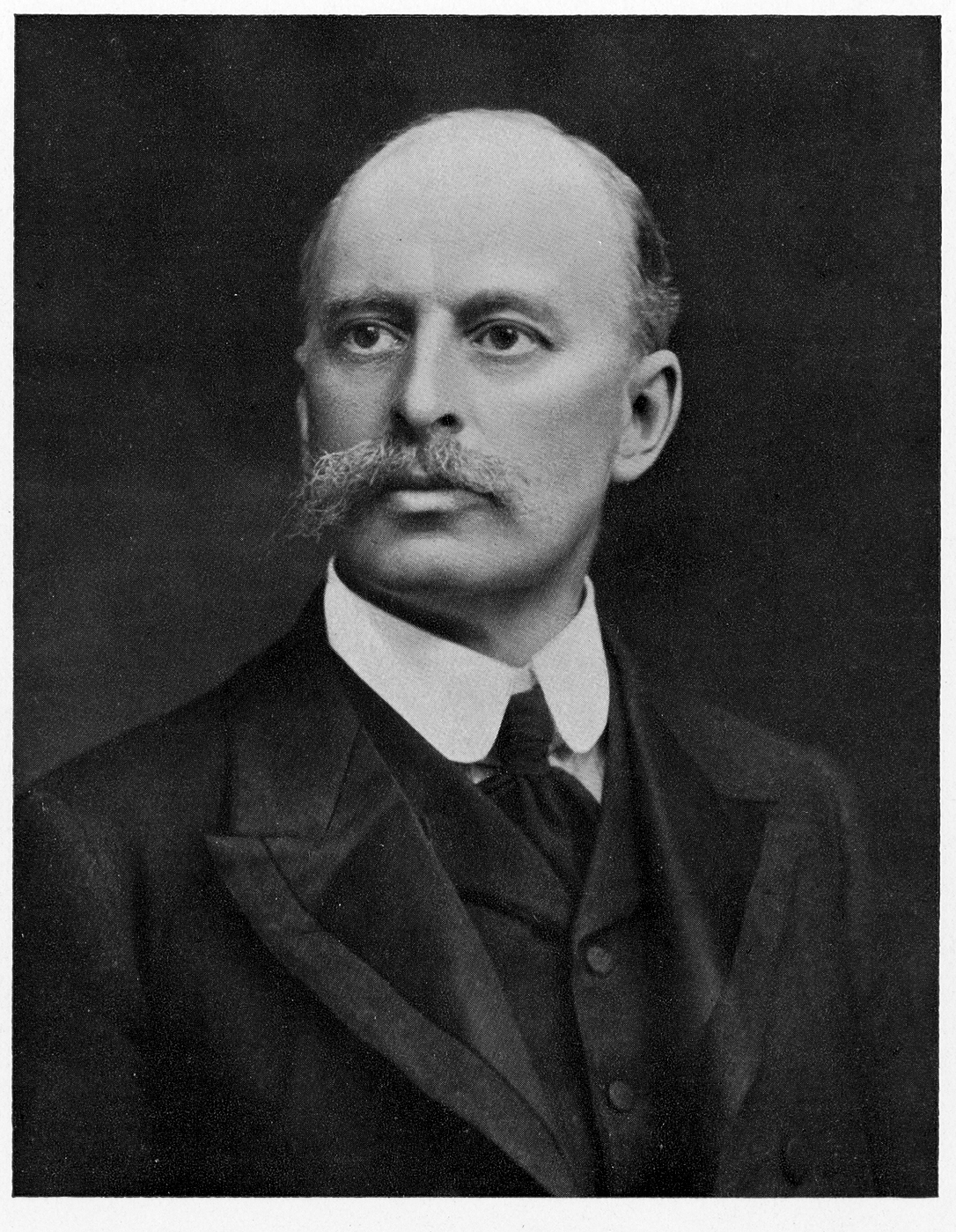
- Photographic portrait of William Morris Mordey, 1908
- Born: 28 March 1856; Donnywell, County Durham, England
- Died: 1 July 1938 (aged 82); Warlingham, Surrey, England
- Occupation: Electrical engineer
- Known for: Mordey alternator Mordey Effect; V curve ∿ symbol for periodicity The Equaliser; Mordey-Fricker meter
- Awards: Telford Medal (1901)
- Engineering career
- Employer(s): Brush Electrical Engineering Company; Mordey and Dawbarn

William Morris Mordey (28 March 1856 – 1 July 1938) was a British electrical engineer and inventor who made important contributions the early electricity supply industry. A self-taught engineer from County Durham who later relocated to Bradford to continue working in Telegraphy, he became one of the practical pioneers of alternating-current engineering in Britain. His Mordey Victoria alternators were used at Bankside power station in the city of London (this site is now occupied by the Tate Modern) and at several other power station in Britain and abroad. He solved the problem of parallel alternator operation that made reliable public electricity supply possible, discovered the V-shaped alternator curves now known as V curve still taught today, and in 1889 proposed the ∿ symbol to denote AC periodicity (what is now known as hertz), writing "To save confusion I always write it thus, ∿ and I would suggest that this sign be used unless a better one be forthcoming…" The symbol was later formalised in British Standard BS 3939 Part 6 (from 1966) and internationally as IEC 60417 Symbol 5032 where it remains the standard graphical notation for alternating current worldwide.

Mordey was formally recognised in his lifetime. Serving as President of the Institution of Electrical Engineers, receiving an IEE premium for his work on alternating current, and winning the Telford Medal on a joint 1902 paper “Electrical Traction on Railways” with Bernard Maxwell Jenkin who received the George Stephenson Gold Medal. Mordey also filed 38 British patents, many of which also filed internationally. His work extended from alternators, dynamos, transformers and public electricity supply to electricity meters, railway electrification, electric ignition, electric heating, relays and electromagnetic mineral separation. By the time of his death in 1938, his reputation had faded, partly because the early technical history of electricity supply was "sadly neglected" and because Mordey himself published little about the difficulties he faced. His obituary in The Engineer described him as a pioneer whose work had scarcely received the recognition it deserved, and noted that few younger electrical engineers appreciated the importance of the Mordey Victoria alternator.

== Family and early telegraph service ==
Mordey was born in Donnywell in County Durham on 28 March 1856. The Mordey family had been colliers and shipowners in Sunderland for several generations. William was the second son of John Goodchild Mordey and the grandson of Dr. William Mordey, a surgeon, magistrate and alderman who served multiple terms as Mayor of Sunderland, co-authored a medical account of the 1831 cholera outbreak, and helped establish the city's early public park and championed sanitary and cholera prevention measures.

At the age of fourteen, Mordey entered the postal telegraph service. After a short period in London he was transferred to Bradford. During this time, he devoted his spare time to the physics of telegraphy, relying entirely on his own resources as no tuition was obtainable. He later taught classes in telegraphy, magnetism, and electricity for the Science and Art Department and the City and Guilds of London Institute. In 1881 he sat the City and Guilds Institute examination alongside his own students and obtained the second prize and medal in the advanced stage of telegraphy.

== Career ==
=== Brush Electrical Engineering (1881–1897) ===
At the end of 1881, Mordey left the telegraph service to join the Anglo-American Brush Electric Light Corporation (later the Brush Electrical Engineering Company). He became the company's chief electrician and focused on the design of alternating current (AC) and direct current (DC) dynamos, motors, and transformers.

=== The Mordey Victoria Alternator ===
Mordey is best known for the Mordey Victoria Alternator, based on his 'spider-pole' design, which was designed and built with the Corporation's chief engineer John Smith Raworth. The British patent was GB5162, filed in 1888, with US437501A as an American equivalent.

The design differed significantly from other machines of the period. The magnet wheel, which contained a single coil, was designed so that the poles gripped around the thin disc-shaped armature winding in such a way that all poles on one side had the same polarity. The "Mordey Victoria" alternators played a significant role in the generation of single-phase current and the transition from gas lighting to electric lighting. These alternators, often paired with Raworth engines, were installed at many power plants across Britain and abroad.

=== Power station installations ===
Mordey alternators and Raworth engines and switchgear were "as familiar to pioneer electrical engineers as Parsons' turbo-generators and Reyrolle switchgear are to those operating power stations at the present time." They were installed at stations across Britain. Among the most notable were Pandon Dene, Newcastle (1890), one of the first public power stations in Britain; Bankside, London (1891), which provided the first public AC electricity supply in London on the site now occupied by Tate Modern; and Lynmouth, Devon (1890), one of Britain's earliest hydroelectric installations, where a village that had never had a gas supply went directly from oil lamps to electric street lighting. A Wandsworth, London (1900), where six Raworth engines coupled to Mordey alternators supplied power distributed at 6,000 volts across substations serving south London.

=== Niagara Falls ===
During the planning phase for the Niagara Falls power transmission scheme, Professor George Forbes publicly recommended the Mordey Victoria Alternators for the project in a Cantor Lecture at the Society of Arts on 8 February 1892, stating that "in connection with the Niagara scheme he had recommended synchronising alternate-current machines, the Mordey being specially mentioned." The contract was ultimately awarded to Westinghouse, whose generators used Nikola Tesla's polyphase rotating field system.

=== Great Northern Electric Light Station, Holloway ===
In 1895, three Mordey Victoria alternators at a central generating station at Ashburton Grove, Holloway supplied electric lighting across the Great Northern Railway's main line out of London, a scheme The Engineer described as pioneering.

=== Contemporary recognition and high-frequency alternators ===
In 1892 Nikola Tesla referred to a "machine of the Mordey type," explaining that this as a machine with pole projections of the same polarity. Tesla added that, with few projections and "an armature without iron, as used by Mordey," excellent results had been obtained.

Mordey was also credited in American technical literature. T.C Martin and Joseph Wetzler's The Electric Motor and its applications credited Mordey with first pointing out an important practical precaution concerning iron cores and motor efficiency. Later, J. A. Fleming connected the Mordey type to wireless work, writing that Fessenden, "like Tesla," adopted the Mordey type of alternator for high-frequency generation.

=== Legacy in wireless telegraphy ===
The disc-armature design of the Mordey alternator found direct application in wireless telegraphy. When Canadian radio pioneer Reginald Fessenden constructed the high-frequency alternator used for the world's first radio broadcast on Christmas Eve 1906, transmitting voice and music from Brant Rock, Massachusetts to ships at sea, IEEE historian John S. Belrose described it as "a small machine of the Mordey type, having a fixed armature in the form of a thin disc, or ring, and a revolving field magnet with 360 teeth, or projections," generating 50,000 Hz at 139 revolutions per second.

Fessenden subsequently commissioned Ernst Alexanderson at General Electric to develop a higher-powered machine, which became the Alexanderson alternator used at Marconi's transatlantic wireless stations.

=== Consulting work ===
After leaving Brush in 1897, Mordey went on to work as a consulting engineer in London. By 1898 he was operating from 82 Victoria Street. He entered a partnership with Robert Arthur Dawbarn to form Mordey and Dawbarn. In August 1902 Mordey and Dawbarn were appointed as engineers for the extension of the Johannesburg power station, the construction of electrical tramways and lighting for Pretoria, electrification of the railway from Springs to Randfontein. In 1905 they provided advice on the Johannesburg telephone system, and during 1905-1906 reported on the supply of electricity to government departments in Durban.

During this period Mordey also developed the Mordey-Fricker electricity meter with Guy Carey Fricker, exhibited at the Royal Society and described in The Engineer as a new and simple meter suitable for direct or alternating currents

== Recognition and institutional work ==
Mordey co-authored "Electrical Traction on Railways" with Bernard Maxwell Jenkin. The paper examined direct and alternating current methods of railway electrification, with the authors making the case for single-phase alternating current traction. Lord Kelvin praised the authors for attacking the problem of long lines and for their case for single phase alternating current traction. Mordey received the Telford Medal and Jenkin received the George Stephenson Gold Medal.

Mordey also received honourable mentions from the Council of the Society of Telegraph Engineers for his 1883 paper "Some Prejudicial Actions in Dynamo Machines." He was a member of the council of the Institution of Electrical Engineers from 1890 to 1894. For his contribution on AC working, including the construction of an alternator for parallel working, he received the IEE Premium - the Institution's annual award for the most valuable contribution of the year.

He was named to the British Electrical Committee for the 1893 Chicago Exhibition alongside Lord Rayleigh, Sir William Thomson and Major-General C. E. Webber.

in 1908 he became the President of the Institution of Electrical Engineers. His Inaugural Address compared the British and German electricity supply industries and called for greater government engagement with industrial electrical policy.

Following Silvanus P. Thompson death in June 1916, Mordey, who had been a long-standing friend to Thompson, chaired the committee that acquired Thompson's scientific library for the IEE, serving as one of four trustees and delivering the formal presentation address at the 51st Annual General Meeting in 1923.

== The 1889 IEE paper: On Alternate-Current Working ==
On 23 May 1889, Mordey presented "On Alternate-Current Working" to the Institution of Electrical Engineers. The paper was presented to an audience containing John Hopkinson, William Ayrton, John Ambrose Fleming, Gisbert Kapp, Sebastian Ferranti, Silvanus P. Thompson, W.H. Preece FRS, and John Smith Raworth. The discussion was so significant that a second meeting was convened on 30 May 1889, with the discussion running to 44 pages.

The paper covered six distinct areas: parallel working of alternators, AC motor systems, the ~ symbol and frequency standardisation, conductor skin effect analysis, electrical safety, and hysteresis and eddy current separation.

== The 1893 IEE paper: On Testing and Working Alternators ==
On 23 February 1893, Mordey presented "On Testing and Working Alternators" to the IEE, chaired by W.H. Preece FRS. The paper introduced testing methodology for alternators in service, the Equaliser device for eliminating circulating currents in parallel windings, a six-principle system for parallel working, and the V curve.

== Technical contributions ==
=== Parallel working of alternators ===
One of the fundamental problems of early AC supply was running alternators in parallel. In simple terms, this meant connecting more than one alternator to the same supply network so that they shared the electrical load. If badly controlled, alternators could hunt, fall out of step or destabilise the supply.

Mordey's solution operated on two levels. First, the iron-free armature of his disc alternator produced very low self-induction - the electrical property that caused conventional iron-cored machines to resist synchronisation when connected together. T.C. Martin and Joseph Wetzler's 1888 American textbook credited Mordey with first identifying this design principle, noting that the precaution of keeping armature self-induction low "was first pointed out by Mr. Mordey." Second, Mordey and Raworth developed a method of regulating each alternator's contribution to the shared load by controlling the steam supply to its driving engine rather than attempting to control the electrical output directly. By governing the speed of the prime mover, the phase of the alternator could be held stable relative to the others on the circuit.

He is credited with demonstrating the feasibility of parallel working in engineering practice. The Electrician recorded in 1891 that Mordey "first demonstrated in an engineering fashion the perfect feasibility of running alternators in parallel In his 1893 paper "On Testing and Working Alternators," Mordey explained the practical principles by which he and his colleagues operated alternators in parallel.

=== V curves, alternator testing and the equaliser ===
Mordey described the V-shaped curves produced when alternators were run as motors and the excitation was varied. He observed that for each level of mechanical load there was an excitation value at which armature current reached a minimum, with power factor at its highest. As excitation was increased or decreased from that point, armature current rose, tracing a V-shaped curve on a graph of armature current against excitation current.

This observation is the basis for the V curve associated with synchronous machines, a graph showing armature current as a function of field excitation current whose shape resembles the letter V. The V curve remains a standard concept in electrical machine theory and is covered in undergraduate electrical engineering curricula worldwide.

=== The Mordey effect ===
The Mordey effect is a phenomenon observed in the rotating armature cores of electric machines: the magnetic hysteresis loss in a rotating armature core is lower than in a transformer core subjected to a periodically reversing magnetising force of the same magnitude. This was observed by Mordey during his work on the Mordey alternator at Brush in the 1880s. In studying the alternator's performance, Mordey also conducted systematic measurements of hysteresis loss in rotating iron cores, establishing that the loss differed from that in a transformer core under alternating magnetisation. By 1891 William Edward Ayrton was already referring this as the Mordey effect.

=== Iron aging in transformer cores ===
Working with O. T. Bláthy, Mordey demonstrated in 1895 that the augmentation of hysteresis loss observed in transformer cores in service was caused by heating of the iron. Further investigation by H.F. Parshall and S.R. Roget established that iron heated to between 40°C and 135°C undergoes a continuous increase in hysteresis loss over time, a phenomenon that became known as the ageing of iron.

=== The ∿ symbol ===
In his 1889 IEE paper, Mordey proposed the ∿ symbol to denote periodicity (cycles per second, now known as hertz), writing, "I always write it thus, ∿ and I would suggest that this sign be used unless a better one be forthcoming, and that we agree to speak of periods, instead of alternations or reversals, and of periodicity instead of frequency or rates of alternation or of reversal." At the time, engineers used terms such as "alternations" and "reversals" inconsistently, sometimes meaning full cycles and sometimes half cycles. Mordey argued for clearer terminology. On 30 May 1889, responding to Lord Rayleigh's preference for the word "frequency", Mordey explicitly entered "a plea for the sign ∿ as rendering confusion impossible".

The symbol was subsequently adopted by contemporary electrical engineers. Recorded use include George Forbes in 1894, W. E. Ayrton, and J. A. Fleming. The Electrician also used the symbol in editorial notation and supply-table context from at least 1891, including national AC supply surveys, where it appears in forms such as "2,000 volts. 100~". Mordey continued use the symbol in his own later IEE papers including "2,000 volts 50~" in 1901 and 1909.

J. A. Fleming's adoption is especially significant because he carried the sign into his major wireless telegraphy textbooks, where it appeared alongside identification of the Tesla high-frequency alternator as the "Mordey or Disk Type", a connection Fleming added to his 1910 second edition following Fessenden's 1906 radio broadcast.

The symbol was later formalised into British Standard BS 3939 (first published as a separate sections from 1966), where it appears as the standard graphical notation or symbol for alternating current AC. BS 3939 Part 6 was produced with the participation of the Institute of Electrical Engineers and is now codified as IEC 60417-5032 and Unicode character U+223F, named "SINE WAVE".

== Patents and inventions ==
Mordey filed at least 38 British patents, many also filed internationally, with corresponding applications in Europe and North America.Among his most significant patents are the following.

Among his most significant patents are the following:

- 1888 Patent GB5162: Electric generator - the foundational Mordey disc alternator.
- 1900 Patent GB190002710A: Improvements in electricity meters, with Guy Carey Fricker.
- 1902 Patent GB190224112A: Improvements in alternating-current traction systems, with Arnold Greaves Hansard.
- 1912 Patent GB191224563A: Improvements in electric-ignition devices.
- 1919 Patent GB165822A: Improvements in electromagnetic separation or concentration of minerals.
- 1923 Patent US1463713A: electromagnetic mineral separation US equivalent.
- 1934 Patent GB426860A: Electrical treatment of mineral and other material to separate its constituents.

A full list of Mordey's British patents is available via Espacenet

== Physical survivals ==
The Science Museum Group holds at least six Mordey related objects across two institutions. Mordey was also a member of the advisory council of the Science Museum in South Kensington.

At the Science Museum's store at Wroughton, Wiltshire, object 1915-298 is a motor generator set comprising a Mordey inductor alternator and Victoria motor, credited to the Board of Trade.

At the Science and Industry Museum, Manchester, the Y1986.15 group comprises a complete Brush hydro-electric installation of 1894, originating from a water-powered electrical installation at Waterside near Hawkshead in the Lake District. The group of five objects includes Y1986.15.2, a Mordey Victoria Transformer rated at 3,000 watts, embossed with the words "Mordey Victoria Transformer" and manufactured by the Brush Electrical Engineering Company at Loughborough. The installation was made by Frederick Fowkes. A permanent People record for Mordey has been created in the museum's Collections Online database, linked to the Y1986.15 objects.

== Death and legacy ==
Mordey spent the latter part of his life in retirement. He died at Warlingham, Surrey, on 1 July 1938, aged 82. The New York Times obituary described him as an engineer and magnetician who had helped develop electromagnetic machinery, including the modern dynamo, generator and transformer, and noted his apparatus for separating ores.

His work had received prominent contemporary coverage. Scientific American published a dedicated illustrated article on the 250-kilowatt Mordey Victoria alternator, reflecting the international technical interest in his generating machinery, while his later papers, medals, patents and IEE presidency brought formal professional recognition.

Unlike many of his contemporaries, whose reputation endured, Mordey's faded. His 1938 obituary in The Engineer opened by stating that his work in the early electricity-supply industry “The death of Mr. W. M. Mordey, at the age of eighty-two, removes from the electrical profession a man whose work in the early days of electricity supply scarcely seems to have received in recent times the recognition it deserves.” It added that "Few of the younger generation of electrical engineers appear to appreciate important part Mordey Victoria alternators played in the generation of single-phase current or to what extent the originator of those machines contributed to the solution of the problems that presented themselves when electric lighting began to replace gas." The obituary compared the former familiarity of Mordey alternators and Raworth engines with that of Parsons turbo-generators and Reyrolle switchgear to the succeeding generation.

The same obituary observed that the technical history of early electricity supply had been "sadly neglected" and that with Mordey's death "scarcely anyone is left" to record the practical difficulties of the pioneer era, noting that Mordey himself "never published anything directly relating to" the difficulties he had faced.

== Sources ==
- M.I.E.E. (1906). "The Electric Transmission of Power". English Mechanics and the World of Science. 83. E. J. Kibblewhite: 590–592.
- Mordey, W.M. (1889). "Alternate Current Working" (PDF). Journal of the Institution of Electrical Engineers. 18 (81): 583–630. doi:10.1049/jiee-1.1889.0031.
- Mordey, W.M. (1889). "Discussion on Alternate Current Working" (PDF). Journal of the Institution of Electrical Engineers. 18 (81): 631–675. doi:10.1049/jiee-1.1889.0032.
- Mordey, W.M. (1893). "On Testing and Working Alternators" (PDF). Journal of the Institution of Electrical Engineers. 22 (104): 110–134. doi:10.1049/jiee-1.1893.0004.
- Haslewood, W.; Mordey, W. (1832). History and Medical Treatment of Cholera, as it appeared in Sunderland in 1831. London.
- Baily, Francis Gibson (1896). "The hysteresis of iron and steel in a rotating magnetic field". Philosophical Transactions of the Royal Society A. 187 (187): 715–746. Bibcode:1896RSPTA.187..715B. doi:10.1098/rsta.1896.0018.
- Fleming, John Ambrose (1911). "Electromagnetism" . Encyclopædia Britannica. Vol. 9 (11th ed.). pp. 226–232.
- "William Morris Mordey". Grace's Guide.
- "Bankside Power Station". Grace's Guide.
- "John Smith Raworth". Grace's Guide.
- "Dover Power Station". Grace's Guide.
- Westrin, Theodor (1925). "Mordey, William". Nordisk familjebok (in Swedish). Vol. 38. Stockholm: Nordisk familjeboks förlags aktiebolag.
- "Re William Morris Mordey, deceased". The London Gazette. No. 34548. 6 September 1938. p. 5706.
- "The Lynmouth Power Station 1890".
- "Early Electricity in the South West" (PDF). BIAS Journal. 16. 1983.
- "Motor Generator Set with Mordey Inductor Alternator". Science Museum Group Collection.
- "250-Kilowatt Mordey-Victoria Alternator". Scientific American. 1892.
