= Bibliography of encyclopedias: business, information and economics =

This is a list of encyclopedias and encyclopedic/biographical dictionaries published on the subject of business, information and information technology, economics and businesspeople in any language. Entries are in the English language except where noted.

== General business ==
- Becker, William H. The Encyclopedia of American Business History and Biography. Facts on File/Bruccoli Clark Layman, 1988–.
- Bly, Robert W. (1 May 1999). The Encyclopedia of business letters, fax memos, and e-mail. Career Press. ISBN 978-1-56414-375-4.
- Business leader profiles for students. Gale Research, 1999–2002. ISSN 1520-9296.
- Carey, Charles W., Ian C. Friedman. American inventors, entrepreneurs, and business visionaries. Facts On File, 2010. ISBN 9780816081462.
- Drexler, Kateri M. (2007). Icons of Business: An Encyclopedia of Mavericks, Movers, And Shakers. Greenwood Publishing Group. ISBN 978-0-313-33863-2.
- Encyclopedia of Business. Gale Research, 1994.
- Folsom, W. Davis; Boulware, Rick (1 January 2009). Encyclopedia of American Business. Infobase Publishing. ISBN 978-1-4381-0986-2.
- Fucini, Joseph J., Suzy Fucini. Entrepreneurs, the men and women behind famous brand names and how they made it. G.K. Hall, 1985. ISBN 9780816187089.
- Geisst, Charles R. (1 January 2009). Encyclopedia of American Business History. Infobase Publishing. ISBN 978-1-4381-0987-9.
- Gelbert, Doug. So who the heck was Oscar Mayer? Barricade Books, 1996. ISBN 9781569800829.
- Gove, John. Made in America: the true stories behind the brand names that built a nation. Berkley Books, 2001. ISBN 9780425178836.
- Grace's Guide to British Industrial History
- Hall, Linda D. (14 March 2008). Encyclopedia of Business Information Sources. Gale / Cengage Learning. ISBN 978-0-7876-9703-7.
- Hamilton, Neil A. American business leaders: From colonial times to the present. ABC-CLIO, 1999. ISBN 9781576070024.
- Hirahara, Naomi. Distinguished Asian American business leaders. Greenwood Press, 2003. ISBN 9781573563444.
- Ingham, John N., Lynne B. Feldman. Contemporary American business leaders: a biographical dictionary. Greenwood Press, 1990. ISBN 9780313257438.
- Kaliski, Burton S. (2001). Encyclopedia of Business and Finance. Macmillan Reference USA. ISBN 978-0-02-865067-8.
- Krismann, Carol. Encyclopedia of American women in business: from colonial times to the present. Greenwood Press, 2005. ISBN 9780313327575.
- MacCusker, John J. History of world trade since 1450. Macmillan Reference USA, 2006. ISBN 9780028658407.
- Marquis Who's Who. Who's who in finance and business. (formerly Who's who in finance and industry. Marquis Who's Who, 1936–. ISSN 1930-3262.
- Miller, William J. Encyclopedia of International Commerce. Cornell Maritime Press, 1985.
- Northrup, Cynthia Clark. Encyclopedia of world trade: from ancient times to the present. Sharpe Reference, 2005. ISBN 9780765680587.
- Olson, James S. and Susan Wladaver-Morgan. Dictionary of United States Economic History. Greenwood, 1992.
- Porter, Glenn. Encyclopedia of American Economic History: Studies of the Principal Movements and Ideas. Scribner's, 1980.
- Presner, Lewis A. The International Business Directory and Reference. Wiley, 1991.
- Roark, William (14 June 2006). Concise Encyclopedia of Real Estate Business Terms. Psychology Press. ISBN 978-0-7890-2342-1.
- Schlager, Neil, Schlager Group. International directory of business biographies. St. James Press, 2005. ISBN 9781558625549.
- Sherrow, Victoria. A to Z of American women business leaders and entrepreneurs. Facts on File, 2002. ISBN 9780816045563.
- Spalding, Hugh Mortimer (1903). Encyclopedia of business law and forms ... for all the states and Canada, with notes and authorities. P.W. Ziegler.
- Standard and Poor's register of corporations, directors, and executives. Standard and Poor's. ISSN 0361-3623.
- Warner, Malcolm (1996). Encyclopedia of Business and Management. Routledge. ISBN 978-0-415-07399-8.
- Warner, Malcolm (1 March 1997). Pocket international encyclopedia of business and management. International Thomson Business Press. ISBN 978-1-86152-113-2.
- Warner, Malcolm (1997). Concise International Encyclopedia of Business and Management. International Thomson Business Press. ISBN 978-1-86152-114-9.
- Warner, Malcolm (2002). International encyclopedia of business and management. Thomson Learning. ISBN 978-1-86152-953-4.
- Wasserman, Paul (1970). Encyclopedia of business information sources: a detailed listing of primary subjects of interest to managerial personnel, with a record of sourcebooks, periodicals, organizations, directories, handbooks, bibliographies, and other sources of information on each topic. Gale Research Co.
- Woy, James B. (1992). Encyclopedia of Business Information. Gale Research Co. ISBN 978-0-8103-7489-8.

== Accounting and finance ==
- Pescow, Jerome. Encyclopedia of Accounting Systems. rev. ed., Prentice-Hall, 1976.
- Shim, Jae K. and Joel G. Siegel. Encyclopedic Dictionary of Accounting and Finance. Prentice-Hall, 1989.

== Banking and finance ==
- Munn, Glenn G. and F. L. Garcia and Charles J. Woelfel. Encyclopedia of Banking and Finance. 9th ed., St. James Press, 1991.
- Thorndike, David. The Thorndike Encyclopedia of Banking and Financial Tables. 3rd ed., Warren, Gorham, & Lamont, 1987.

== Economics ==
- Arestis, Philip, Malcolm C. Sawyer. A biographical dictionary of dissenting economists. E. Elgar, 2000. ISBN 1858985609.
- Blang, Mark, Howard R. Vane. Who's who in economics. Edward Elgar Publ., 2003. ISBN 9781840649925.
- Blaug, Mark. Great economists since Keynes: an introduction to the lives and works of one hundred modern economists. Edward Elgar, 1998. ISBN 9781858986920.
- Cicarelli, James, Julianne Cicarelli. Distinguished women economists. Greenwood Press, 2003. ISBN 9780313303319.
- Eatwell, John. The New Palgrave: A Dictionary of Economics. Stockton Press, 1987.
- Greenwald, Douglas. McGraw-Hill Encyclopedia of Economics. 2nd ed., McGraw-Hill, 1994.
- Henderson, David R. Fortune Encyclopedia of Economics. Warner, 1993. ISBN 9780446516372
- Henderson, David R. The Concise Encyclopedia of Economics. Liberty Fund, 2008. ISBN 9780865976665
- Pressman, Steven. Fifty major economists. Routledge, 2014. ISBN 9780415645096.
- Rutherford, Donald. The biographical dictionary of British economists. Thoemmes, 2004. ISBN 9781843710301.

== Insurance ==
- Singer, Isidore. International insurance encyclopedia. American encyclopedic library assoc., 1910.

== Labor ==
- Filipelli, Ronald L. Labor Conflict in the United States: An Encyclopedia. Garland, 1990.
- Jones, Lawrence K. Encyclopedia of Career Change and Work Issues. Oryx, 1992.

== Management ==
- Finch, Frank. Facts on File Encyclopedia of Management Techniques. Facts on File, 1985.
- Heyel, Carl. The Encyclopedia of Management. 3rd ed., Van Nostrand, 1982.
- Witzel, Morgan. Biographical dictionary of management. Thoemmes, 2001. ISBN 9781855068711.
- Witzel, Morgen. The encyclopedia of the history of American management. Thoemmes Continuum, 2005. ISBN 9781843711315.

== Money ==
- Newman, Peter. The New Palgrave Dictionary of Money and Finance. Stockton Press, 1992.

== Real estate ==
- Arnold Encyclopedia of Real Estate. Warren, Gorham, & Lamont, 1978.
- Gross, Jerome. Webster's New World Illustrated Encyclopedic Dictionary of Real Estate. 3rd ed., Prentice Hall, 1987.
- Newell, James. The St. James Encyclopedia of Mortgage & Real Estate. St. James Press, 1991.

== Statistics ==
- International Encyclopedia of Statistics. Free Press, 1978.
- Kotz, Samuel and Norman L. Johnson. Encyclopedia of Statistical Sciences. Wiley, 1982–88.
- Sills, David L., ed. International Encyclopedia of the Social Sciences. Free Press, 1968.

== Tourism ==
- Jafari, Jafar (9 December 2003). Encyclopedia of Tourism. Taylor & Francis. ISBN 978-0-415-30890-8.

== See also ==
- Bibliography of encyclopedias
