= Home energy storage =

Local type of energy storage

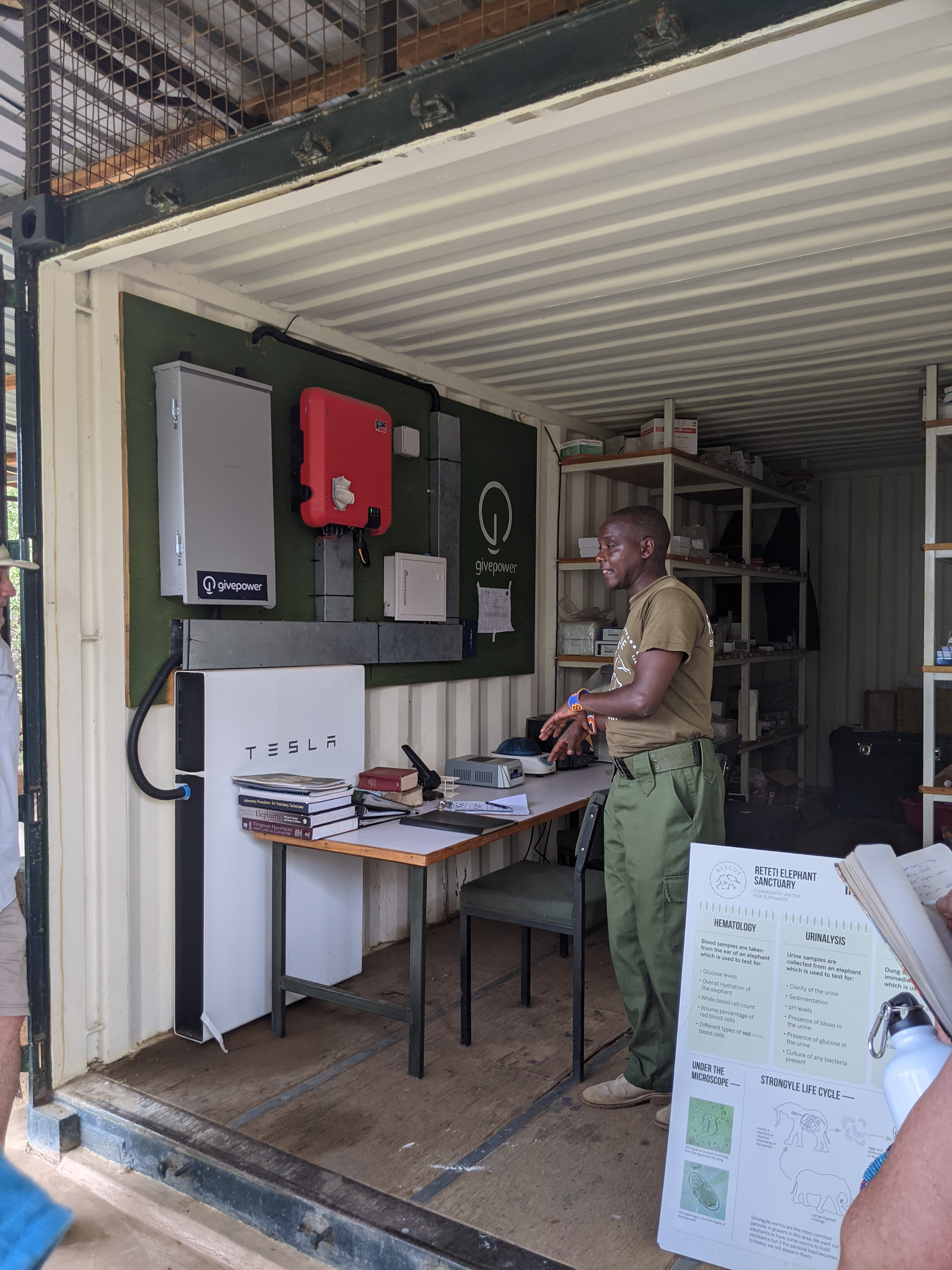
Home energy storage Tesla Powerwall 2

Home energy storage refers to residential energy storage devices that store electrical energy locally for later consumption. Usually, electricity is stored in lithium-ion rechargeable batteries, controlled by intelligent software to handle charging and discharging cycles. Companies are also developing smaller flow battery technology for home use. As a local energy storage technologies for home use, they are smaller relatives of battery-based grid energy storage and support the concept of distributed generation. When paired with on-site generation, they can virtually eliminate blackouts in an off-the-grid lifestyle.

The stored energy commonly originates from on-site solar photovoltaic system such as rooftop solar panels, which generate direct current electricity during daylight hours. The solar electricity can be backfed to the grid (often rewarded with a feed-in tariff) via a solar inverter, or it can be stored in a home energy storage system as a stand-alone power system for later consumption after sundown. This allows the household to take advantage of the peak solar generation during the day hours (when homes are typically unoccupied with low electricity usage due to the occupants being away at work or at school) and use it later to offset after-hour consumption from the grid, thus avoid the higher power costs during the domestic peak demand hours (usually from mid-afternoon to mid-evening). The home energy storage can also serve as a backup battery in the events of power outage to keep essential lighting, heating, computing and home medical equipment running without disruption.

Small wind turbines are less common but still available for home use as a complement or alternative to solar panels.

== Market trends ==
=== Automotive companies ===
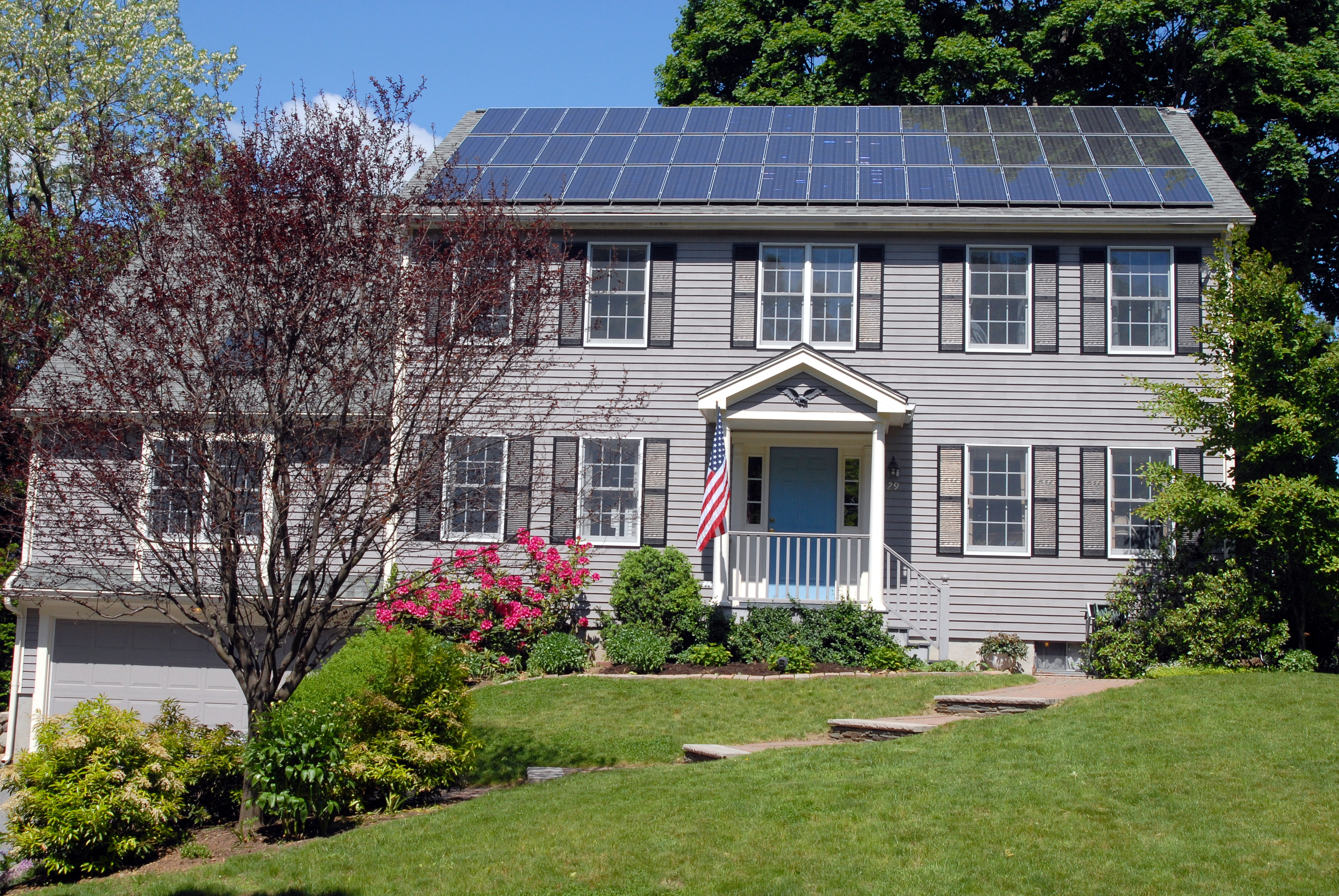
Solar panel in a residential space

There has been a trend of automotive companies cooperating with other leaders in the energy industry in order to develop home energy storage solutions. This is likely due to a lot of the research and development that goes into powerful batteries having the potential to benefit both automotive and residential industries. Manufacturers such BMW in their partnership with Solarwatt and Nissan in conjunction with Eaton are strong examples of this trend. Additionally, BYD and Tesla market own-brand home energy storage devices to their customers.

Despite initial high costs bringing a lot of scrutiny, the home energy storage market is seeing an increase in revenue following a trend in lowering prices

=== Tariffs ===
The units can also be programmed to exploit a differential tariff, that provide lower priced energy during hours of low demand - seven hours from 12:30am in the case of Britain's Economy 7 tariff - for consumption when prices are higher.

Smart tariffs, stemming from the increasing prevalence of smart meters, will increasingly be paired with home energy storage devices to exploit low off-peak prices, and avoid higher-priced energy at times of peak demand.

== Advantages ==
=== Overcoming grid losses ===
Transmission of electrical power from power stations to population centres is inherently inefficient, due to transmission losses in electrical grids, particularly within power-hungry dense conurbations where power stations are harder to site. By allowing a greater proportion of on-site generated electricity to be consumed on-site, rather than exported to the energy grid, home energy storage devices can reduce the inefficiencies of grid transport.

=== Energy grid support ===
Home energy storage devices, when connected to a server via the internet, can theoretically be ordered to provide very short-term services to the energy grid:

- Reduced peak hour demand stress - provision of short-term demand response during periods of peak demand reducing the need to inefficiently stand up short generation assets like diesel generators.
- Frequency correction - the provision of ultra short-term corrections, to keep mains frequency within the tolerances required by regulators (e.g., 50 Hz or 60 Hz +/- n%).

=== Reduced reliance on fossil fuels ===
Due to the above efficiencies, and their ability to boost the amount of solar energy consumed on-site, the devices reduce the amount of power generated using fossil fuels, namely natural gas, coal, oil and diesel.

== Disadvantages ==
=== Environmental impact of batteries ===
Lithium-ion batteries, a popular choice due to their relatively high charge cycle and lack of memory effect, are difficult to recycle.

Lead-acid batteries are relatively easier to recycle and, due to the high resale value of the lead, 99% of those sold in the US get recycled. They have much shorter useful lives than a lithium-ion battery of a similar capacity, due to having a lower charge cycle, narrowing the environmental-impact gap. In addition, lead is a toxic heavy metal and the sulfuric acid in the electrolyte has a high environmental impact. In addition, a 2026 life-cycle assessment of a residential solar photovoltaic system with lithium iron phosphate battery storage in Ottawa, Canada, estimated greenhouse gas emissions of 67.6 grams of CO₂-equivalent per kilowatt-hour of electricity delivered. This study essentially found that solar panel manufacturing accounted for most climate-related impacts, while battery production was the largest contributor to mineral resource consumption. Highlighting that even though batteries contribute to renewable energy they are also harmful to the environment.

==== Second life for electric vehicle batteries ====
To offset the environmental impact of batteries, some manufacturers extend the useful life of used batteries taken from electric vehicles at the point where the cells will not sufficiently hold charge. Though considered end of life for electric vehicles, the batteries will function satisfactorily in home energy storage devices. Manufacturers supporting this include Nissan, BMW and Powervault.

==== Salt water batteries ====
Home Energy Storage devices can be paired with salt water batteries, which have a lower environmental impact due to their lack of toxic heavy metal and ease of recyclability.

Saltwater batteries are no longer being produced on a commercial level after the bankruptcy of Aquion Energy in March 2017.

=== Grid defection ===
With an increasing amount of consumers choosing to implement solar panels that feed energy solely to their home and home batteries, grid defection has continued to grow. As the number of people off grid increases, the cost of the grid will be spread across fewer consumers making, "the incentive to go off-grid only grow". This is seen as an increasingly large disadvantage to home energy storage, as it could lead to the abandoning of a large infrastructure network created to maintain grids, price inflation for those on grid, and a hindrance to the energy transition.

== Other forms of storage ==
Storing energy in batteries is far from the only option. Multiple forms of storing energy exist such as flywheels, hydroelectric, and thermal energy.

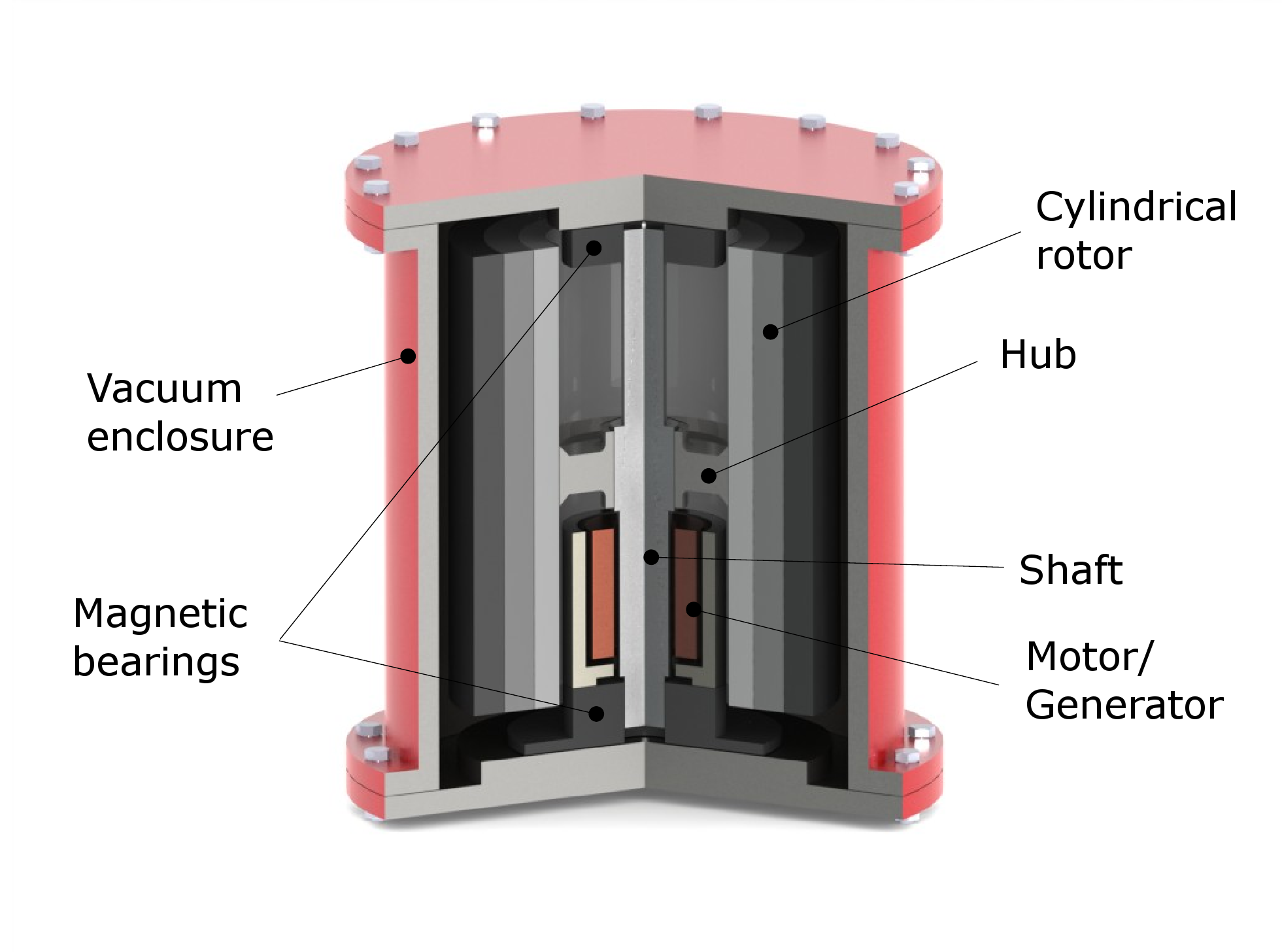
Components of a flywheel

=== Pico hydro (hydroelectric) ===
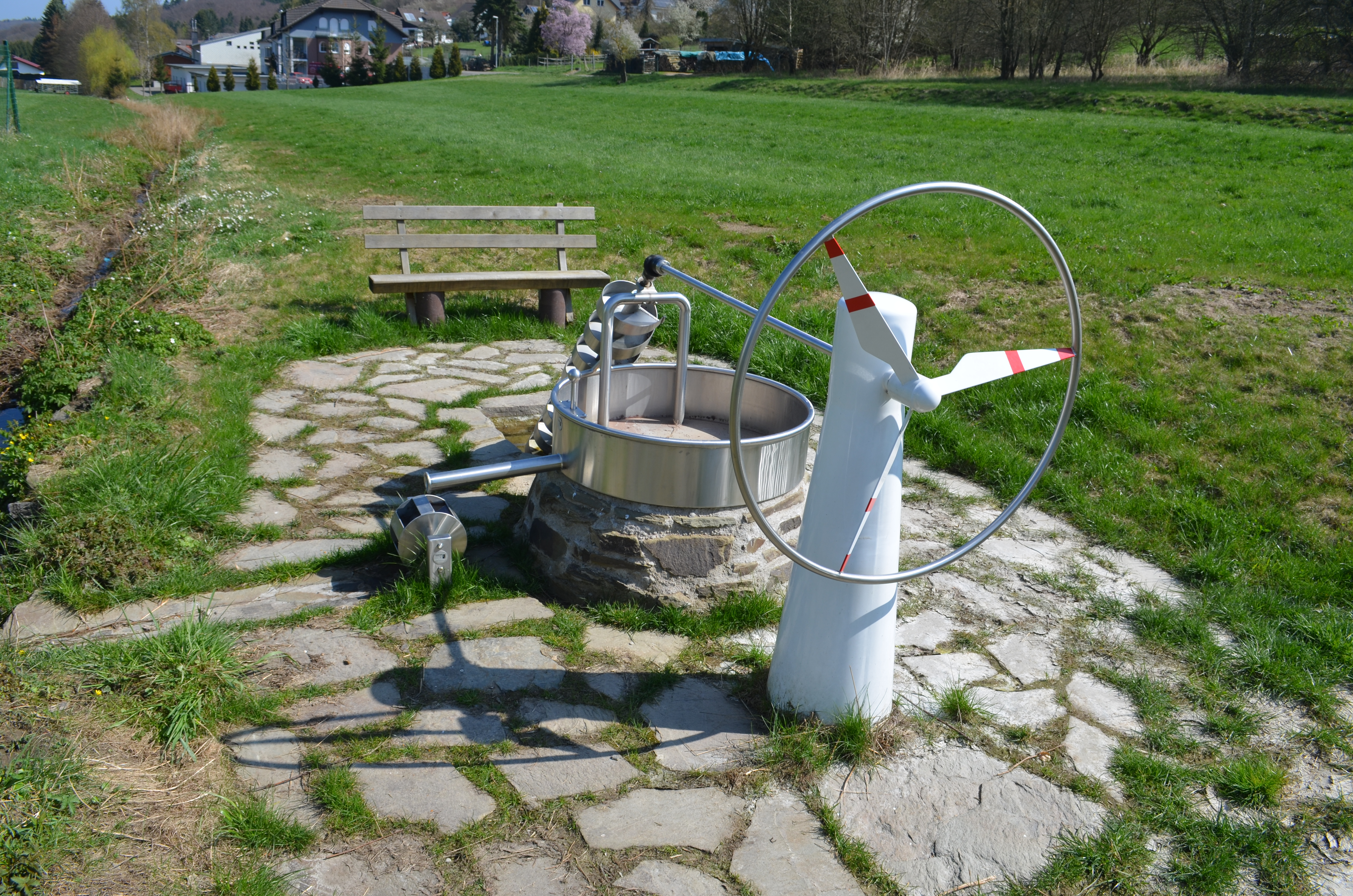
Pico Hydro

Using a pumped-storage system of cisterns for energy storage and small generators, pico hydro generation may also be effective for "closed loop" home energy generation systems.

=== Thermal energy storage ===
A storage heater or heat bank (Australia) is an electrical heater which stores thermal energy during the evening, or at night when electricity is available at lower cost, and releases the heat during the day as required.

Accumulators, like a hot water storage tank, are another type of storage heater but specifically store hot water for later use.

Some systems may be portable or partially portable for easier transportation to another location, or use during transportation or travel.

== See also ==
- Energy storage
  - Rechargeable battery
  - UltraBattery
  - Flow battery
- Criticism of vehicle-to-grid
- Distributed generation
- Backfeeding
- Other forms of grid-energy storage
- Smart grid
- Energy storage as a service
- Uninterruptible power supply
- Emergency power system
