= Radio teleswitch =

Electric grid operating device

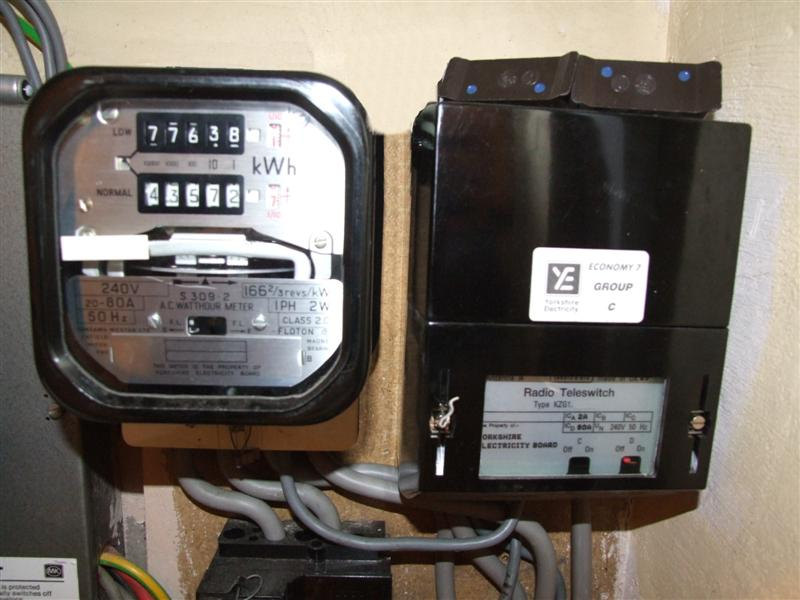
Economy 7 meter and radio teleswitch, right

A radio teleswitch is a device used in the United Kingdom primarily to allow electricity suppliers to switch large numbers of electricity meters between different tariff rates, by broadcasting an embedded signal in broadcast radio signals. Radio teleswitches are also used to switch on/off consumer appliances to make use of cheaper differential tariffs such as Economy 7.

As a consequence of the final end of radio transmissions on 198 kHz long wave, the UK-wide teleswitch service permanently ceased on 30 June 2026.

== Service role ==
The typical use of a teleswitch is to manage the start and end times of off-peak charging periods associated with tariffs such as Economy 7 and Economy 10. This includes switching between 'peak' and 'off-peak' meter registers as well as controlling the supply to dedicated off-peak loads such as night storage heating. The use of dynamic switching instead of a fixed timer allows some additional demand management, such as by flexing start and finish times for electric heating loads according to prevailing overall demand levels.

Some suppliers also offer more sophisticated heating control using the radio teleswitch network. For example, Scottish Power 'Weathercall' and SSE's 'Total Heat Total Control' both dynamically vary the length of time storage heating is energised each night depending on the forecast temperature for the following day to help maintain a consistent household temperature.

Teleswitching has also been used to help level out demand in areas where the supply network is close to capacity. In the 1990s, Manweb used such a system to provide different households with different off-peak periods on a weekly alternating basis. By spreading out the high peak demand associated with electric storage heating in Mid Wales, the company avoided upgrading costs of over a million pounds, and £200,000 a year in reduced use-of-system charges.

In the north of Scotland, the radio teleswitch service is also used to help control the local electricity distribution network for resilience purposes.

== Operation ==
Each of the user companies (the RTS Users, or Service Providers) has its own database on the Central Teleswitch Control Unit (CTCU), which is an HPE Integrity computer running OpenVMS on IA-64 for reliability and clustering technology to minimise downtime.

The database defines how each group of teleswitches belonging to the user-company will control the loads and meter registers connected to it. The CTCU uses the database and certain rules to generate and control a continuous string of messages, which is forwarded to the BBC for transmission.

Although each message will be received by all installed teleswitches, the unique user and group-codes carried by the message ensure that only teleswitches carrying the same combination of codes will act on it.

== History ==
The Radio Teleswitch Service (RTS) has its origins in the energy management projects initiated in the United Kingdom by the Electricity Council in the early 1980s. Three projects investigated the feasibility of using the telephone network, the distribution network and national radio for large scale energy management purposes. The radio teleswitch project was chaired by Walter Waring, deputy chairman of Eastern Electricity, and supported by the BBC.

The idea of phase modulating control and data signals onto the low frequency carrier wave used for broadcasting the BBC Radio 4 programmes was tested. The BBC was satisfied that there was no discernible distortion of its broadcast service and no infringement of its Royal Charter.

The technique won the Queen's Award for Technology, while its application for controlling consumer tariffs and loads was approved by the Home Office. The project was funded by the CEGB and the mainland electricity boards, which were each allocated one of sixteen message channels. One channel was reserved for testing and the final one was allocated to Northern Ireland when it joined the project.

The Central Teleswitch Control Unit (CTCU) system was updated in 2007 to replace the obsolete computing hardware with brand new, modern, fully supported equipment. The old DEC MicroVAX machines were replaced with HP Integrity 2660s. The operating system has also been upgraded to OpenVMS 8.4. No effort has been made to upgrade the obsolete transmitter hardware. All communications lines have also been updated and Internet access has been introduced in addition to the dial-in access by modem.

The new system went live at the end of January 2008 and the update has markedly improved the performance and stability of the system.

In 2016, it was reported that over 1.6 million teleswitches were in use. Around 190,000 were reported as being used dynamically to control loads such as heating on a day-to-day basis, with the remainder following generally fixed switching times that were updated less frequently.

In early 2020, 1.4 million electricity meter 'MPAN' locations were thought to still be using radio teleswitching – although the actual number of individual premises may have been lower as some single-household installations use two MPAN references for historical technical reasons.

By the end of May 2025, the number of radio teleswitch meters left in service had reduced to 314,395.

== Formal agreements ==
The Electricity Association (EA), which was previously known as the Electricity Council, entered into a renewed formal agreement with the BBC in 1996 as an agent of the users. The EA had also negotiated an agreement with the National Grid Company (NGC) concerning the servicing of the CTCU. Since 2004 the functions of EA regarding this contract have been taken over by the Energy Networks Association.

== Transmitter and service obsolescence ==
The Radio Teleswitch Service was broadcast alongside the 198 kHz longwave output of BBC Radio 4 from the Droitwich, Westerglen and Burghead transmitting stations.

In October 2011, the BBC stated that the Droitwich transmitter, including Radio 4's longwave service and Radio Teleswitch, would cease to operate when one of the last two valves broke, and no effort would be made to manufacture more nor to install a replacement longwave transmitter. The BBC stated that their plan was simply to cease broadcasting on longwave forever once the Droitwich transmitter failed. It has been reported that the BBC estimated that fewer than ten spare compatible valves existed in the world, and that each valve had a working life of between one and ten years.

In 2016, the Energy Networks Association consulted on the future of the service, highlighting that no agreement for its operation past the end of 2017 existed. While most suppliers acknowledged the system could ultimately be replaced by smart meter functionality, there was general agreement that the system would need to continue until at least 2020 to avoid significant inconvenience to customers and agreement was secured for the service to continue until the end of March 2020.

Several further extensions were negotiated between the Energy Networks Association and the BBC from 2019 onwards, due to the lack of progress in developing suitable smart meter alternatives. In late 2020 SSE, one of the major users of the service, began informing its customers that teleswitched meters would be withdrawn and replaced with alternative solutions.

The availability of radio teleswitching had been progressively extended and as of early 2021 the service was due to remain in operation until at least March 2024. By that date, however, the radio frequency (in England) was expected to be switched off in summer 2025.

As of October 2024, there were 800,000 Radio Teleswitch meters remaining to be replaced, with the RTS system then due to be switched off on 30 June 2025. In January 2025, the RTS Taskforce launched an advertising campaign to encourage customers to have their meters upgraded. On 19th June, the Department for Energy Security and Net Zero announced that "a widespread switch-off [...] will not happen on 30 June", the service being phased out in stages instead.

The BBC closed ended its long wave Radio 4 broadcast on 27 June 2026. On 30 June 2026, the long wave platform of the BBC closed.

At the time of the switchoff, 100,000 meters remained in use across the UK, with 33,000 in Scotland alone. Another source had earlier estimated that some would remain until March 2027.

== See also ==
- Economy 7
- Economy 10

== References and more information ==
1. Adapted from: "An introduction to the Radio Teleswitch Service". Shau Sumar – EA internal document, 2003.
2. D.T. Wright: L.F. radio-data: specification of BBC phase-modulated transmissions on long-waves, Report 1984–19, BBC Research & Development, January 1984
3. British Standards: BS 7647:1993 "Radio teleswitches for tariff and load control"
4. Energy Networks Association
