= Electricity Association =

The Electricity Association (EA) was an association of major electricity companies in the United Kingdom.

It closed on 30 September 2003, and its services were replaced by three other industry bodies:

- Association of Electricity Producers
- Energy Networks Association
- Energy Retail Association

== See also ==
- Energy Networks Association Document Catalogue, includes documents of the former Electricity Association
