= Reserve service =

Reserve service may refer to the following:

- A military reserve force
- The National Grid Reserve Service in the United Kingdom
