= Base Power (company) =

American energy storage company

- Type: Private
- Industry: Energy storage
- Founded: 2023
- Founders: Zach Dell; Justin Lopas
- Headquarters: Austin, Texas, United States
- Area served: Texas and Illinois
- Key people: Zach Dell (CEO); Justin Lopas (COO)
- Products: Home energy storage systems
- Website: Base Power

Base Power is an American energy storage company based in Austin, Texas. Founded in 2023 by Zach Dell and Justin Lopas, the company develops and installs battery storage systems for homes, which provide backup power during power outages and can supply electricity to the electrical grid during periods of high demand.

The company operates in Texas and the Chicago area of Illinois. In August 2026, Base Power was valued at $13 billion following a $1 billion funding round.

== History ==
Base Power was founded in Austin, Texas, in 2023 by Zach Dell and Justin Lopas. The company initially focused on residential battery storage in Texas and subsequently expanded into Illinois, its first market outside Texas.

In October 2025, Base Power leased the former distribution center of the Austin American-Statesman at 305 South Congress Avenue in Austin as a temporary site for its first factory. The company had previously outsourced battery production. In August 2026, the company said the factory was producing thousands of battery systems a month, including its Base Core battery. Base Power is also building a larger permanent factory near Austin–Bergstrom International Airport, a planned investment of $265 million, with completion expected in 2027.

In August 2026, Base Power announced a $1 billion funding round that valued the company at $13 billion. At the time, it had installed more than 23,000 batteries in homes in Texas and the Chicago area.

== Leadership ==
Zach Dell is the co-founder and chief executive officer of Base Power. He is the son of technology businessman and investor Michael Dell. Dell co-founded the company with Justin Lopas, who serves as its chief operating officer. Before co-founding Base Power, Lopas worked at SpaceX and Anduril Industries.

== Business ==
Base Power installs battery storage systems at residential properties. The batteries provide backup electricity during power outages and can also be used to supply electricity to the grid when demand is high. The company describes its model as a distributed energy network in which batteries installed at individual homes can collectively provide additional capacity to the electricity grid.

In 2026, the company expanded into Illinois, initially serving the Chicagoland area. The expansion marked its first market outside Texas.
