= Theodore Paraskevakos =

Greek inventor and businessman

Theodore G. Paraskevakos
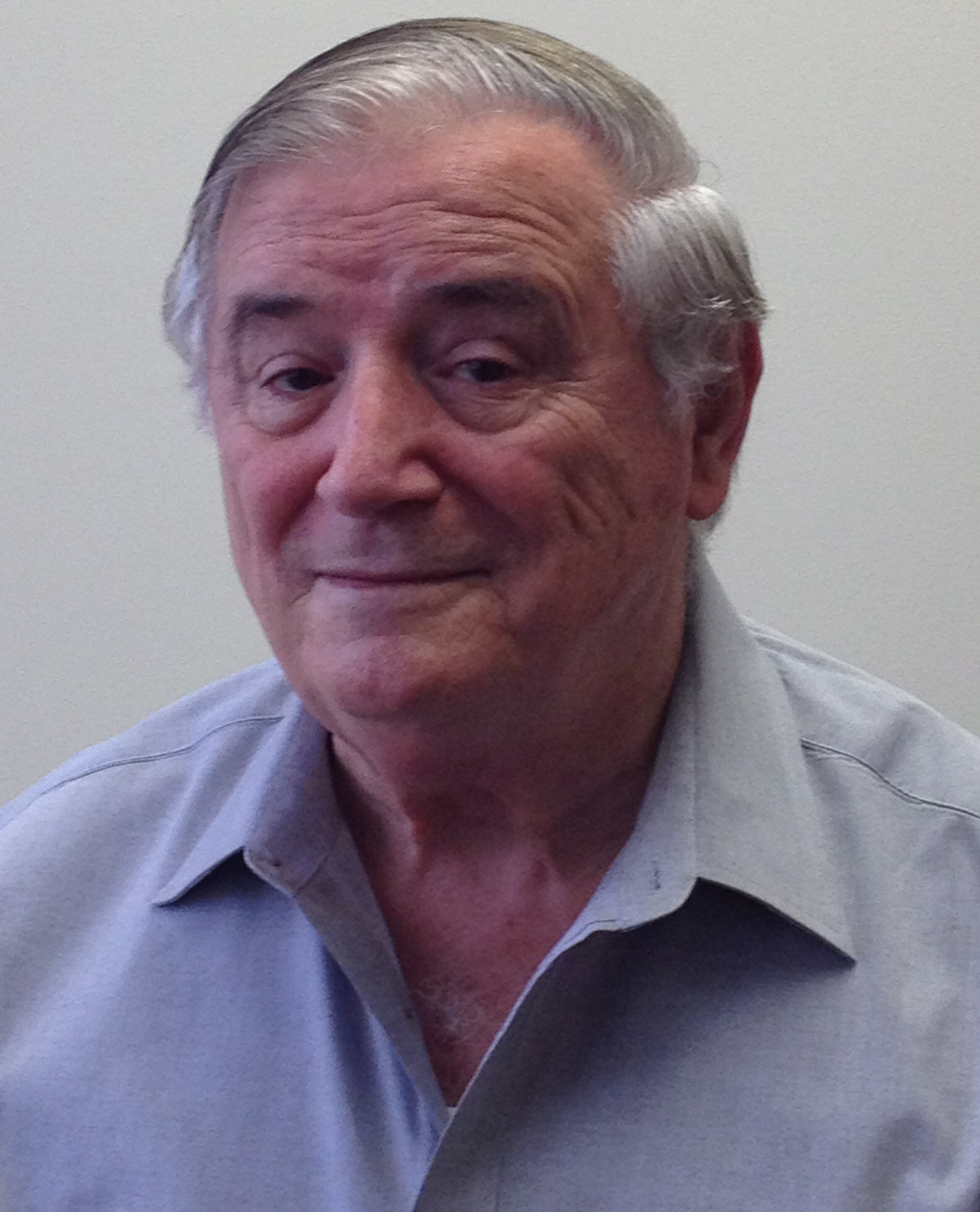
- Theodore Paraskevakos in 2008
- Born: Theodore George Paraskevakos; March 25, 1937; Athens, Greece
- Occupations: Inventor, businessman
- Known for: Data transmission

Theodore George "Ted" Paraskevakos (Greek: Θεόδωρος Παρασκευάκος; born March 25, 1937, in Athens, Greece) is a Greek-American inventor and businessman. Paraskevakos graduated from the Superior College of Electronics in Greece and served for 28 months as communications and electronics instructor in the Hellenic Air Force. He attended a variety of courses for digital engineering in Alabama and in Florida.

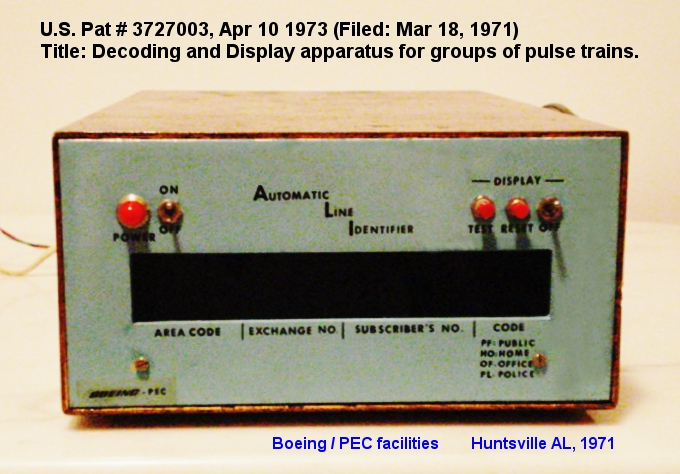
The first caller identification receiver

== Notable inventions ==
Paraskevakos' most notable inventions relate to the transmission of electronic data through telephone lines which formed the original basis for what is now known as caller ID. Paraskevakos began his work in this field in 1968 while working as a communications engineer with SITA and has since been issued over 20 patents worldwide based on this technology. His transmitter and receiver were put into practice in 1971 in a Boeing facility in Huntsville, Alabama.

== Patents ==
Paraskevakos holds over 50 patents worldwide including a digital alarm communication system, which also covered handheld or portable cardiac alarms automatic meter reading and load management, digital vending machine communications, indoor archery, vertical parking, intelligent currency validation network, and a method for identification of currency used in unlawful activity. He founded, among other companies, Metretek, Inc., DataVend, Inc. and Intelligent Currency Validation Network, Inc.
