= Differential tariff =

Differential tariff is an example of demand side management where the price per unit of energy varies with the consumption. If a power utility uses differential tariff, it may change the rate per kWH of energy used during different times, such as raising the price during times of high energy consumption and lowering the price during times of low energy consumption. This helps balance the rate at which power is used and the rate at which power is created.

== Background ==
A differential tariff creates a balance in production and consumption of power by utilizing customer demand. For instance, if there is time where energy is being used faster than can be supplied, a differential tariff can be used: raising the price at that specific time to balance load on the system.

== Differential Tariff ==
To implement the above-mentioned method of flattening the load curve, this technique is employed. As the load decreases and increases, the supplier must install his equipment in a way which will be capable of supplying the peak consumer load. During low periods, the equipment will be underutilized, thereby decreasing the energy efficiency of the equipment. Therefore, the supplier will try to ensure that the equipment is used at its rated capacity so as not to waste resources, which cost money. With this type of tariff, the consumer will try to consume more energy during the low periods and avoid energy consumption during peak hours because they are more expensive.

== Examples ==
=== United Kingdom ===
Since the 1970s, tariffs such as Economy 7 and 'White Meter' have offered domestic consumers cheaper electricity in off-peak hours, usually for a fixed, continuous period of between 7 and 8.5 hours overnight. Typically such tariffs are used in conjunction with storage heaters, which charge up cheaply overnight and release heat slowly during the following day.

While many such installations use a simple timeswitch, households may also be fitted with a radio teleswitch which allows more dynamic switching. For example, the supplier EDF advertises its Economy 7 service in the London area as offering 7 hours of off-peak electricity between midnight and 8.00am; the precise start and finish times can be varied to smooth out peak demand.

Bespoke local off-peak tariffs have also been created to help manage demand. For example, the electricity company MANWEB found its supply network in Mid Wales overstretched in the early 1990s due to high peak demand for electric heating overnight. In response, it created a bespoke tariff and used radio teleswitches to stagger off-peak heating times and better distribute loads across the day. Now known as TwinHeat, the tariff saved the company over a million pounds in network reinforcement costs.
