= Zellweger off-peak =

Electric switching device

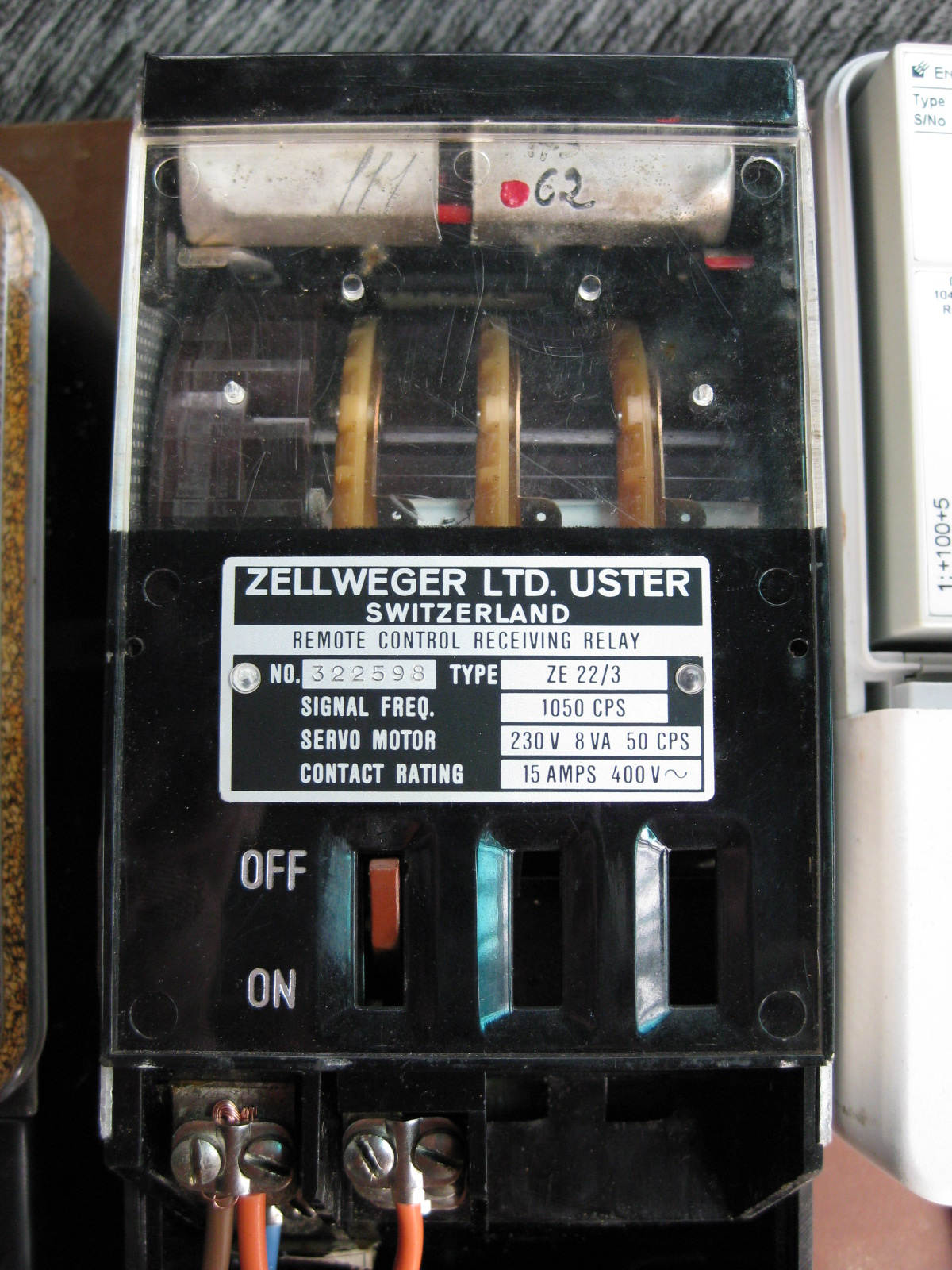
Zellweger Relay ZE 22/3 with outside cover removed. At the top in silver can be seen the glow tube.

Zellweger is the brand name of an electric switching device also known as a Ripple Control Receiver used to control off-peak electrical loads such as water heaters by switching these loads OFF over peak energy use times of the day and switching them ON after peak energy use times of the day, hence the term 'off peak' control. It is an example of carrier current signaling.

The Ripple Control Signal is generated at substations owned by Electricity Supply Authorities (as distinct from Electricity Generating Authorities) connected to the High Voltage transmission grid and injected into the Medium Voltage transmission grid at 11kV, 22kV, 33kV and 66kV, through a Coupling Cell consisting of a tuned L-C circuit (Tuning Coil - Capacitor). The Coupling Cell enables the Ripple Control Frequency to be superimposed on the 50 Hertz (Hz) mains frequency, which promulgates into the 415 V 3 phase power distribution lines providing energy to industrial and domestic customers of the Electricity Supply Authority. To avoid problems with other equipment connected to the distribution system; i.e. industrial machinery and domestic appliances, the ripple frequency is selected to be offset from the third harmonic and its multiples, typically starting at 167 Hz and including, 217, 317, 425, 750, 1050, 1650. The choice of frequency depends upon the density of the load into which the ripple frequency is to be injected and the length of the distribution.

Power stations transmit on the main transmission lines when off-peak rates start (often around 10 pm). This ripple noise is picked up by the Zellweger, which after a random delay turns the hot water heater on. The noise is often picked up by other equipment, especially audio amplifiers and stereos and the noise can cause problems with other electrical devices. It is especially audible from ceiling fans running at low speed. Even some telephone lines can pick up the noise. The noise can be particularly obtrusive from some fluorescent light systems, as well as ELV and LED lights.

Newer electrical meters incorporate this technology into the meter. "Time of use" meters charge electricity to the current tariff within half an hour, giving customers incentive to run appliances such as dishwashers, pool pumps and clothes dryers during the night.

== Impact ==
Coal power stations have plenty of unused capacity late at night but must keep running as they take days to shut down. Off-peak rates are used as an incentive for customers to use this surplus capacity and to reduce the amount of peak demand. This can produce cheaper power by delaying the need to build new power stations and reduce environmental impact. The random time delay in the Zellweger means that the power stations aren't hit with a huge demand when all the hot water systems turn on at the same time; rather, the load is spread over a greater time period.

== History in Australia ==
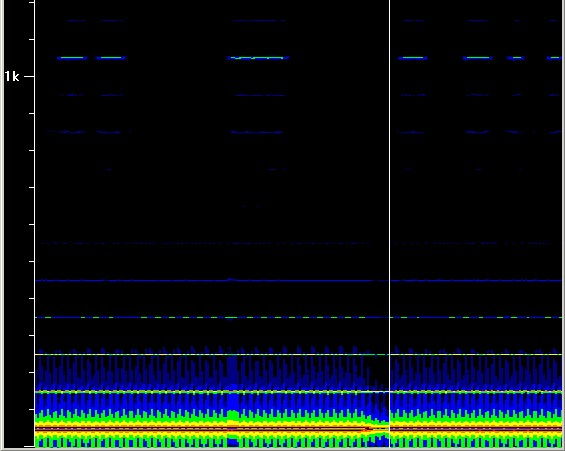
Example capture: The bright line at 50 Hz is the power frequency, followed by odd harmonics at 150 Hz, 250 Hz and so on. The ripple being turned on and off is clearly visible at 1050 Hz

Originally time-clocks were used; however, they can easily lose accurate time and are not easily adjusted for daylight saving time. Before the amalgamation of County Councils in New South Wales (NSW), County Councils in NSW and Queensland Electricity Boards were Zellweger's main Australian customers. Brisbane City Council was among the first Australian customers South East

Zellwegers were first introduced in Australia in 1953, but were not compliant with modern harmonic disturbance standards. The second generation was introduced in the 1970s and was more reliable. A variety of devices can still be seen across Australia.

In at least some parts of Sydney, the ripple frequency is 1042 Hz. The signal usually consists of several bursts of a few seconds on and off, followed by a period of up to 50 seconds on. This is coded to affect only selected equipment. Occurrences are very frequent, sometimes several times an hour throughout the day, not just at evening and morning off-peak times.

== Radioactive Glow Tube ==
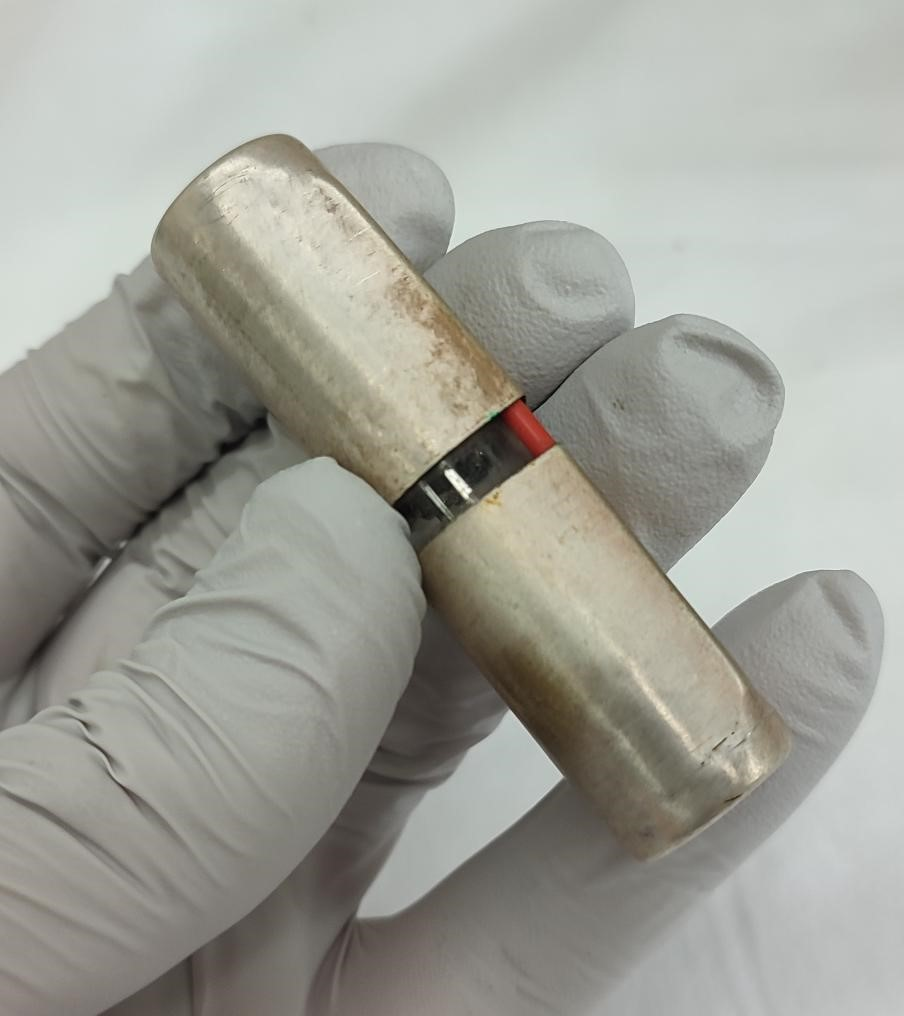
Radioactive Zellweger Glow Tube removed from the main relay for disposal. There are no indicators to alert to the presence of radioactive materials

Zellweger ZE22/3 contain low-risk radioactive material, and must be only handled by authorised people as breakage of the glass tube could cause a dangerous situation by releasing the radioactive material. This device features a 'glow tube' that contains either radium-226 or tritium. Each glow tube is sealed within a glass envelope that houses two electrodes separated by an air gap. One of the electrodes is typically coated with radioactive material to create an ion path between the electrodes, facilitating the operation of the control circuitry.

The glass envelope is encased within two aluminum sleeves, which serve as electrical contacts to the control circuitry. An insulated conductor connects the top contact to the glass tube feed-throughs.

The radioactive source within the device ionizes the fill gas, ensuring reliable and consistent operation by providing a steady current when a high voltage is applied. This design prevents the device from relying on random events (e.g., cosmic ray, background gamma ray) to initiate the current, thereby enhancing its performance and stability.

== New Zealand equipment ==
A few images are attached from an older electromechanical Zellweger ripple plant near Silverdale. Many of these Zellweger plants are still in use in New Zealand. Frequency used is 1050 Hz, superimposed upon the 50 Hz mains. Solid state Zellweger equipment is used as well, which can directly inject into the 22 kV or 33 kV sub transmission mains instead of the 11 kV mains as with these older Zellweger plants.

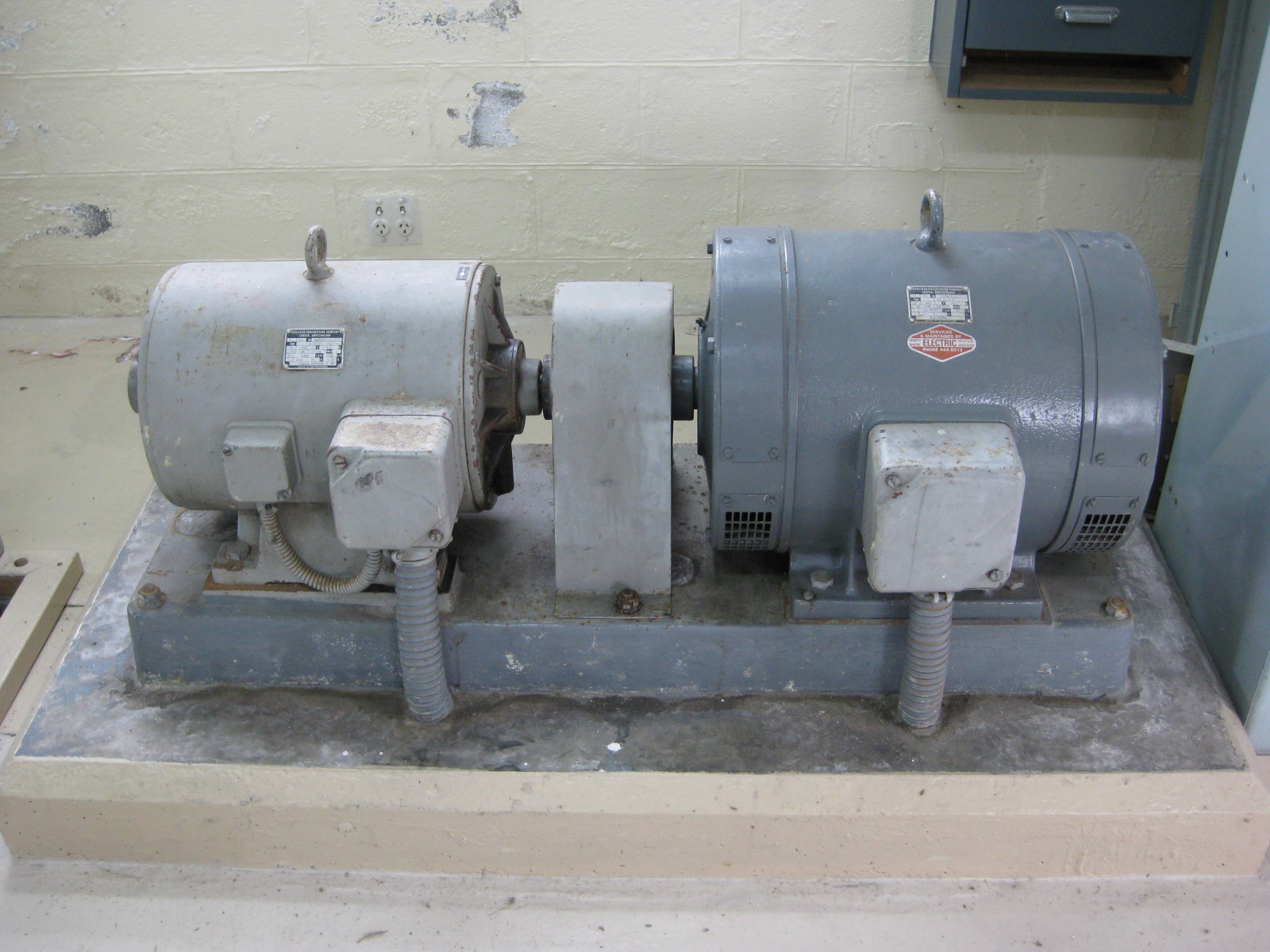
Zellweger Motor Generator set

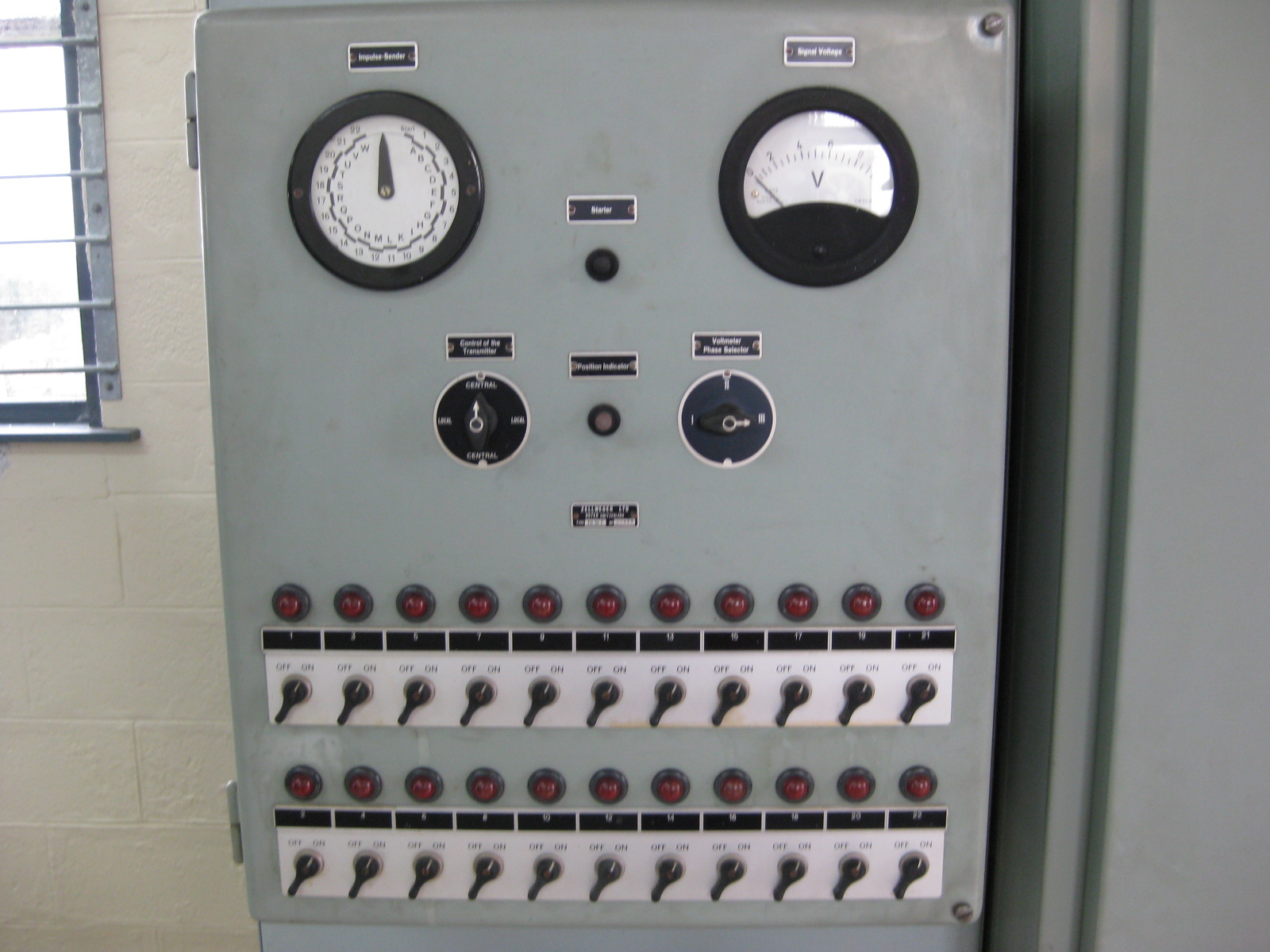
Zellweger Control Panel

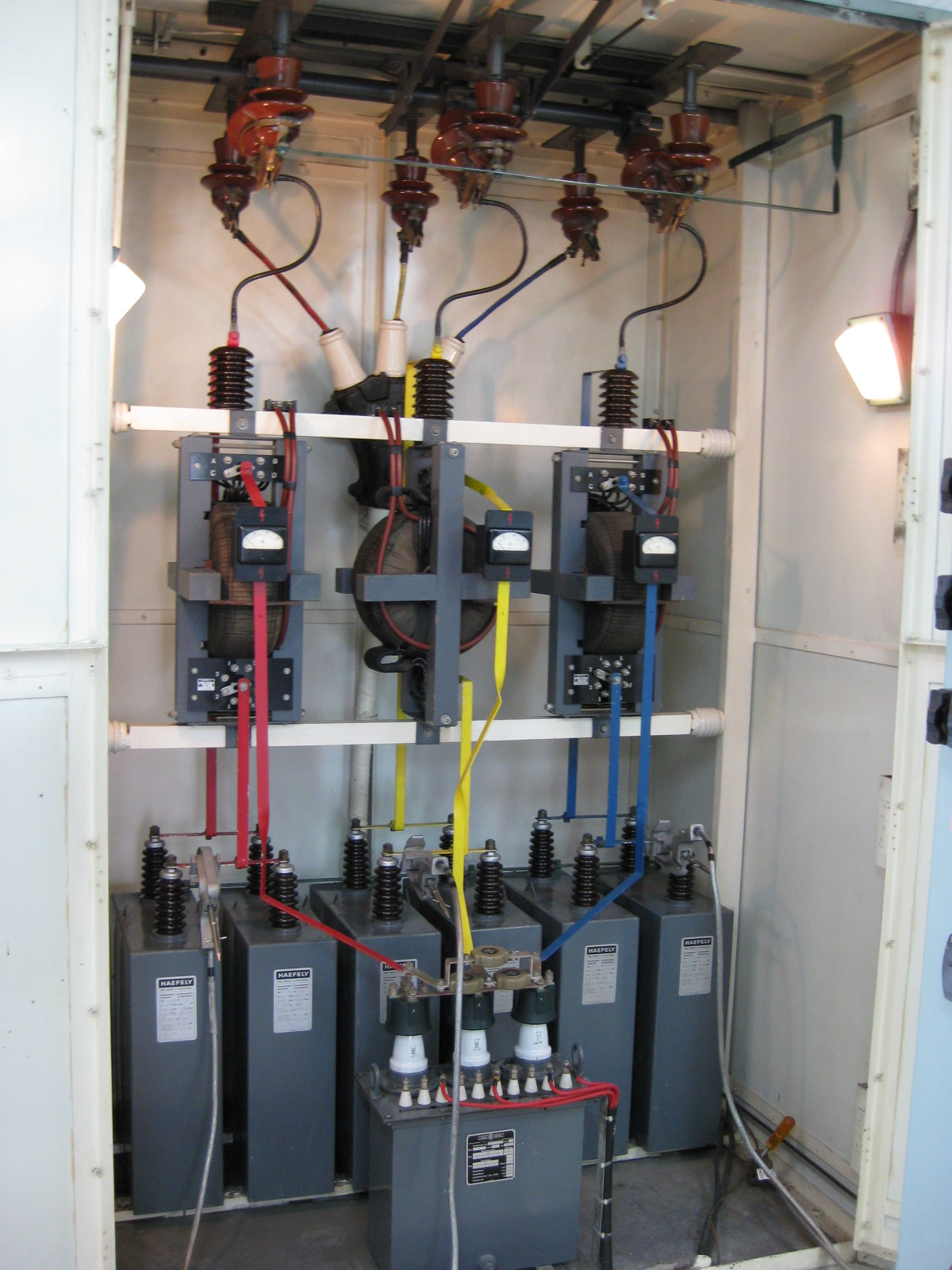
Zellweger Tuning coils and Capacitors
