= Economy 10 =

Differential tariff

Economy 10 is the name of a tariff provided by United Kingdom electricity suppliers created in 2004. It is named because the corresponding electricity plan offers ten hours of off-peak access during each 24-hour period. It was designed to reduce the electricity costs of overnight electric heating and serves a similar purpose to similar to Economy 7. The specific ten hour period varies between locations and electricity suppliers, and generally includes a combination of afternoon, evening and off-peak hours.

In contrast to Economy 7, which only provides off-peak electricity during nighttime hours, Economy 10 tariffs provide ten hours of off-peak heating split between night, afternoon and evening. The advantage of this scheme is that by matching the storage periods better to the times when heat is required, less heat needs to be stored during the day, when there may be no demand for heating. The afternoon and evening periods also provide a top-up to heating systems at off-peak prices.

Off-peak electricity costs can be half of the peak prices, but many Economy 10 tariffs levy an increased standing daily charge.

The structure of the ten off-peak hours is determined by the local distribution network operator rather than the electricity supply company and they vary across the fourteen regions in the UK. Times are switched automatically, and it is common for the switching times to be locked to either GMT or BST when the meter is installed. Some metering systems use a radio teleswitch controlled by the supplier to vary switching times, and effect the daylight saving time switchover twice a year. Economy 10 thus requires a special multi-tariff meter, different from an Economy 7 meter.

For example, customers in central Scotland (within the Scottish Power Energy Networks DNO area) are on the following times:

- 3 hours in the afternoon (1:30 pm - 4:30 pm)
- 4 hours in the evening (8:30 pm - 12:30 am)
- 3 hours in early morning (4:30 am - 7:30 am)

Another set of times (West Midlands) are:

- 3 hours in the afternoon (1 pm - 4 pm)
- 2 hours in the evening (8 pm - 10 pm)
- 5 hours overnight (Midnight - 5 am)

With the popularity of smart meters increasing in the 2010s, a variety of alternative off-peak tariffs were introduced by different electricity supply companies.

== Closure ==
As with Economy 7, this tariff service permanently ceased operating just after 12:00 BST on 30 June 2026, when the 198 kilohertz transmission from all three of its source transmitters was shut down.

== See also ==
- Load balancing (electrical power)
- Smart grid
