= Load balancing (electrical power) =

Techniques by electrical power stations to store excess electrical power

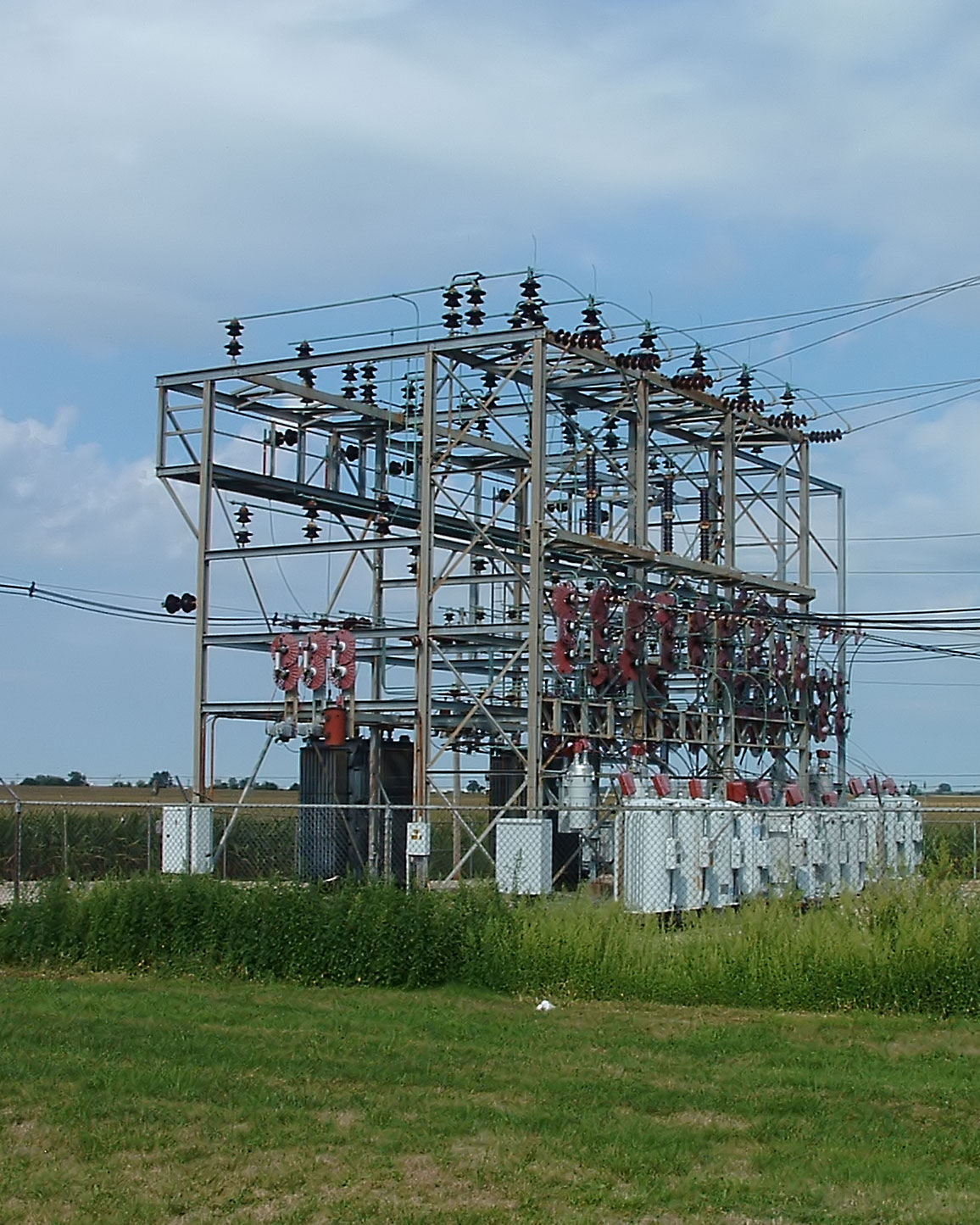
Electrical substation

Load balancing, load matching, or daily peak demand reserve refers to the use of various techniques by electrical power stations to store excess electrical power during low demand periods for release as demand rises. The aim is for the power supply system to have a load factor of 1.

Grid energy storage stores electricity within the transmission grid beyond the customer. Alternatively, the storage can be distributed and involve the customer, for example in storage heaters running demand-response tariffs such as the United Kingdom's Economy 7, or in a vehicle-to-grid system to use storage from electric vehicles during peak times and then replenish it during off peak times. These require incentives for consumers to participate, usually by offering cheaper rates for off peak electricity.

== Batteries and smart grid ==
Telephone exchanges often have arrays of batteries in their basements to power equipment and in the past metro systems such as the London Underground had their own power stations, not only giving some redundancy but also using the grid for load balancing. Today these supplies often have been replaced by direct supply from the grid and so are no longer available for the purpose of load balancing.

Solutions to the load balancing problem focus on "smart grid" technology, in which many consumer and industrial appliances would communicate with the utility using digital means, and could be switched on and off by the utility to run at off-peak hours.

In a very basic demand balancing system, the power company sends a signal down the line or by a dedicated phone chip to turn on a special circuit in the home. Typically, a storage device for space heating or a water heater will be connected to this circuit. The electricity is turned on after the evening peak demand, and turned off in the morning before the morning peak demand starts. The cost for such power is less than the "on-demand" power which makes it worthwhile for the user to subscribe to it.

A nuanced system is possible with benefits for the power company and the electricity user. Once home devices contain the appropriate electronics, it will no longer be necessary to have devices connected to a special circuit. The power company can send a signal saying that power is now available at a better rate and this signal will turn on any device (dish washer for instance) that has the dial set for "when available" power (priority 2). Manufacturers can provide priority settings on their machines and the power company sending a number of signals as they need more demand to balance supply, or set the machine for lower priority to use lower cost energy. An electric car might even have a setting for "charge and supply"; charging when electricity is least expensive and returning energy when it is most expensive.

The power company benefits by selling more energy; consumer devices can receive signals via the internet when excess power is available, or when it is more expensive. Demand Side Response lessens the need to run expensive "peaking capacity" power stations when there is a high demand for power, and can encourage use when surplus electricity is available.

Vehicle-to-grid is a system under development allowing electric cars to provide power to the grid at times of high demand, low supply from e.g. wind and solar power and therefore high prices, and charge the car again when the price is lower, based on the energy need the car owner has defined in the car settings (such as need for long distance drive next morning or only short work commuting).

== See also ==
- Electrical grid
- Grid balancing
- Power system reliability
- Load following power plant
- Load profile
- Electricity generation
- Distributed generation
- Dispatchable generation
