= Energy storage as a service =

Energy storage as a service (ESaaS) allows a facility to benefit from the advantages of an energy storage system by entering into a service agreement without purchasing the system. Energy storage systems provide a range of services to generate revenue, create savings, and improve electricity resiliency. The operation of the ESaaS system is a unique combination of an advanced battery storage system, an energy management system, and a service contract which can deliver value to a business by providing reliable power more economically.

== History ==
Scott Foster, Energy Director of the United Nations Economic Commission for Europe, is one of the leading global advocates for energy as service. He coined the term 'iEnergy' to propagate an annual/monthly subscription fee for energy, rather than the present-day commodity-led pay per kilowatt of electricity system. Foster believes a service-led system would put the onus on the energy supplier to improve reliability and offer the best possible service to customers.

The term ESaaS was developed and trademarked by Constant Power Inc., a Toronto-based company, in 2016. The service has been designed to work in the North American open electricity markets. Notable other companies offering Energy Storage-as-a-Service include GI Energy, AES Corporation, TROES Corp., Stem Inc, and Younicos.

== Components ==
ESaaS is the combination of an energy storage system, a control and monitoring system, and a service contract.

The most common energy storage systems used for ESaaS are lithium-ion or flow batteries due to their compact size, non-invasive installation, high efficiencies, and fast reaction times but other storage mediums may be used such as compressed air, flywheels, or pumped hydro. The batteries are sized based on the facility's needs and is paired with a power inverter to convert the DC power to AC power in order to connect directly to the facility’s electricity supply.

ESaaS systems are remotely monitored and controlled by the ESaaS operator using a Supervisory Control and Data Acquisition (SCADA) system. The SCADA communicates with the facility's Energy Management System (EMS), Power Conversion System (PCS), and Battery Management System (BMS). The ESaaS operator is responsible for ensuring the ESaaS system is monitoring and responding to the facility’s needs as well as overriding commands to participate in regional incentive programs such as coincident peak management and demand response programs in real time.

The facility benefiting from the ESaaS system is linked to the ESaaS system operator through a service contract. The contract specifies the length of the service term, payment structure, and list of services the facility wishes to participate in.

== Services ==
ESaaS is used to perform a variety of services including:

Coincident Peak Management
During times of high regional demand, Independent Service Operators (ISOs)/Regional Transmission Organizations (RTOs) offer incentives for facilities to reduce or curtail their load. ESaaS allows a facility to isolate or offset their load during these high regional demand periods to decrease demand from the electricity grid to benefit from the incentives. The system is designed to work in conjunction or independent of facility curtailment.
Demand Response
ISOs/RTOs offer facilities payment for curtailing their energy demand when dispatched by the grid operator. ESaaS allows facilities to participate in these programs by off-setting all or a portion of a facility load during a demand response occurrence. A facility can benefit from the incentive without interrupting their facility operation.
Power Factor Correction
During charging and discharging, active and reactive power may be balanced prior to supplying a facility. By balancing the amount of active and reactive power to a facility, the power factor and resulting facility electrical efficiency may be improved. This improvement may reduce a facility's monthly peak demand charge.
Power Quality
ESaaS actively monitors electricity supply to a facility. In times of intermittent power supply, ESaaS acts as an uninterruptible power supply (UPS) to ensure uninterrupted, reliable power supply to eliminate unexpected fluctuations. Fluctuating and intermittent power affects equipment operation which may cause costly delays and defects in production.
Back-up Power
If the electricity grid experiences a power outage, ESaaS offers a back-up power service to continue powering all or a portion of a facility's electricity demand. Depending on the size of the ESaaS installation, ESaaS may maintain facility operation for the duration of a grid failure.
Peak Shaving
ESaaS actively monitors a facility’s energy profile to normalize the electricity draw from the electricity grid. The ESaaS system stores energy when the facility demand is lower than average and discharges the stored energy when the facility demand is higher than average. The result is a steady draw of electricity from the electricity grid and a lower monthly peak demand charge.
Energy Arbitrage
ESaaS actively monitors local electricity spot prices to store energy when the price is low to be utilized when electricity prices are high. This is commonly referred to as arbitrage. The net different in price results in cost savings.
Market Ancillary Services
ESaaS enables facilities to participate in the local ISO/RTO markets to provide services such as frequency regulation, operating reserve, and dispatchable generation. By participating in the local market, facilities can generate revenue through the ESaaS contract.
Transmission Support
ESaaS may provide services to ease congestion and constraint on electricity transmission networks by storing energy during heavy transmission periods to be released during less congested periods. The use of this service can prolong the life of infrastructure and defers system upgrades.

== Markets served ==
ESaaS primarily benefits large energy consumers with an average demand of over 500 kW, although, the service may benefit smaller facilities depending on regional incentives. Current early adopters of ESaaS are manufacturers (chemical, electrical, lighting, metal, petrochemical, plastics), commercial (retail, large offices, medium offices, multi-residential, supermarkets), public facilities (colleges, universities, hotels, hospitality, schools), and resources (oil & extraction, pulp & paper, metals & ore, food processing, greenhouses).

== Benefits ==
=== System benefactor does not require installation capital ===
To participate in an ESaaS service, the installation system benefactor does not require any capital outlay. Upon installing an ESaaS service, the facility sees immediate savings and/or revenue generation. Initial capital is often a hurdle for facilities to adopt an energy storage system since in most cases, the payback period of an energy storage system is 5–10 years.

=== System operated by a third-party system operator ===
ESaaS is a contracted service that is automatically controlled by a third party. This eliminates responsibility for the facility to allocate resources to manage their energy profile allowing a facility to operate their core business. The system operators have knowledge of local electricity sectors that continually monitor and update system protocols as regional markets change. The information is used to optimize the value realized by the ESaaS system while still meeting facility requirements.

=== Environmental ===
For most ESaaS services, energy is stored during night time, off-peak hours when energy production is created from non-carbon emitting sources. The energy is then used to offset the required carbon emitting production during peak-times. The load shifting capability provided by ESaaS displaces heavy emitting generation requirements.

== Pricing ==
ESaaS contracts may be structured as a cost sharing model or a fixed monthly price over a contracted term. Cost sharing models share the economical benefits of ESaaS after they are realized by the customer. The fixed price is based on potential economic benefit and applicable programs in the region of deployment. The ESaaS contract price is always less than the economic value provided by the service to ensure the client retains a net positive value through the service.

== See also ==
- as a service
