= National Grid Reserve Service =

UK electrical supply arrangement

To balance the supply and demand of electricity on short timescales, the UK National Grid has contracts in place with generators and large energy users to provide temporary extra power, or reduction in demand. These reserve services are needed if a power station fails for example, or if forecast demand differs from actual demand. National Grid has several classes of reserve services, which in descending order of response time are: Balancing Mechanism (BM) Start-Up, Short-Term Operating Reserve, Demand Management and Fast Reserve.

== National Grid Frequency Response ==
This is a service that large power users such as steel works, cold stores, large water pumping stations, can offer to the UK National Grid. These contractors have frequency sensitive relays fitted to the incoming breakers, and these disconnect the load if the system frequency falls beyond a pre-set figure (49.7 Hz). These loads are shed for a contracted period of at least 30 minutes. Within this period Standing Reserve (Reserve Service) diesels of similar capacity (i.e., around 660 MW total) start up, and enable the Frequency Service loads to be re-connected and the relays re-armed.

Frequency Service is designed to cope with the loss of two 660 MW sets in quick succession. There is about 2.25 GW of such Frequency Service loads available in the UK to cover a peak demand of about 60 GW.

If the total Reserve Service payments, about 2250 MW × £7,000 = £15.75 million are divided by the total kWh delivered by the National Grid to all customers, approximately 0.3 trillion kWh then this amounts to a total cost of about 0.005p/kWh.

Similar arrangements operate in the United States and France and all other large power grids.

== Short Term Operating Reserve (STOR) ==
At some times of the day National Grid needs access to sources of extra power, in the form of either generation or demand reduction, to be able to deal with actual demand being greater than forecast demand and/or unforeseen generation unavailability. These additional power sources which are available to National Grid are referred to as ‘Reserve’ and comprise synchronised and non-synchronised sources. National Grid procures the non-synchronised requirement primarily by contracting for Short Term Operating Reserve, which is provided by a range of service providers by means of standby generation and/or demand reduction.

The need for STOR varies depending on the time of year, the time of week and time of day, being a function of the system demand profile at that time. To reflect this, National Grid splits the year into a number of Seasons, for both Working Days (including Saturdays) and Non-Working Days (Sundays and most Bank Holidays), and specifies the periods in each day that Short Term Operating Reserve is required. These periods are referred to as Availability Windows.

Short-Term Operating Reserve is a contracted Balancing Service, whereby the service provider delivers a contracted level of power when instructed by National Grid, within pre-agreed parameters. The main, minimum capability requirements for the service are as follows:

- Minimum Contracted MW capability = 3 MW.
- Contracted MW must be achievable no later than 240 minutes after instruction from National Grid.
- Contracted MW must be deliverable for no less than 2 hours.

The service can be provided by both BM and non-BM participants. Utilisation of the service from BM participants is via the Balancing Mechanism. For non-BM service providers, a bespoke monitoring and dispatch system, STOR Dispatch, is installed (formerly known as SRD - Standing Reserve Dispatch).

There are two forms of payment that National Grid will make as part of the service:

1. Availability Payments. Where a service provider makes its unit/site available for the STOR service within an Availability Window, National Grid will pay for that availability on a £/MW/h basis.
2. Utilisation Payments. Where National Grid instructs delivery of STOR from a unit/site, then it will pay for the energy delivered on a £/MWh basis. (This includes the energy delivered in ramping up to and down from the Contracted MW level). For BM service providers this payment will be effected through the Balancing Mechanism.

STOR is subject to a number of restrictions and conditions which include a minimum capacity threshold of 3 MW. Above this capacity it is possible to tender directly to National Grid for the provision of STOR services or via the assistance of an agent. Prospective providers can choose to use an Agent to administer their tender process and, on their behalf, submit STOR Tenders to National Grid. National Grid is willing to deal with Agents provided that no part of the tender process or contracting process is hindered. STOR tenders are evaluated the same way whether submitted directly or through an Agent.

Aggregators provide an alternative for sites that either haven't the 3 MW minimum capacity at a single location or would rather defer the operational responsibilities to a specialised third party service provider. An Aggregator develops and operates multiple sites (STOR Sub Sites) and offers these to National Grid as a single STOR Site. This role is specifically different from that of an Agent.

Whilst an Aggregator can be an asset owner, typically an Aggregator will act on the behalf of one or more third party asset owners to submit "composite" STOR Tenders to National Grid. National Grid therefore perceives the role of an Aggregator as essentially a "Reserve Provider", holding the STOR Contract itself whilst managing the necessary interfaces with the various individual asset owners.

The prices tendered by a potential provider will determine their position in the operational merit order and affect the number of events, operating hours and payment levels they will receive.

== Other National Grid measures ==
The above measures happen routinely and without any interference with normal supplies to consumers. There are other similar arrangements which are used only as a last resort since they do involve disconnecting consumers. If Frequency Response and spinning reserve fails to control grid frequency and it falls too far, then the fans feeding combustion air into power station boilers begin to deliver at an inadequate draft/pressure since they are synchronous, and the output of all power-stations in the grid, goes into irreversible decline. To prevent this, frequency sensitive relays on entire substations trip out, disconnecting entire customer areas on a pre-determined schedule.

This continues until, as a last resort, large areas can be switched out manually.

== See also ==
- Demand response
- Relative cost of electricity generated by different sources
- Economics of new nuclear power plants (for cost comparisons)
- Energy security and renewable technology
- Intermittent energy source
- Northeast Blackout of 2003
- List of energy storage projects
- List of power outages
- Calculating the cost of the UK Transmission network: cost per kWh of transmission
- Calculating the cost of back up: See spark spread
- Load management
- Control of the National Grid
