= Energy Networks Association (United Kingdom) =

Trade association and lobbyist in the UK

- Abbreviation: ENA
- Formation: 1 October 2003
- Legal status: Non-profit company (registered in England & Wales, No. 4832301)
- Purpose: Trade Association of the Energy Networks in the UK
- Location: London, EC2
- Region served: UK and Ireland
- Chief Executive: Lawrence Slade
- Chairman: Phil Jones
- Website: ENA

The Energy Networks Association (ENA) is the industry body funded by electricity transmission and distribution licence holders. Its current Chief Executive is Lawrence Slade.

== History ==
ENA was formed in October 2003 from the dissolution of the Electricity Association into three separate industry bodies:

- Energy Networks Association
- Association of Electricity Producers
- Energy Retail Association

Following the demerger of the Gas Distribution Network operations of British Gas Transco, they also joined ENA.

The ENA announced in April 2022 that it had a new 3-step action plan to modernise the process of connecting assets to the UK power grid. In December 2022, Lawrence Slade was appointed as chief executive.

In March 2023, the ENA called on the UK government to develop an energy storage strategy by the end of the year.

In October 2026, the ENA published the Electricity Networks Sector Growth Plan.

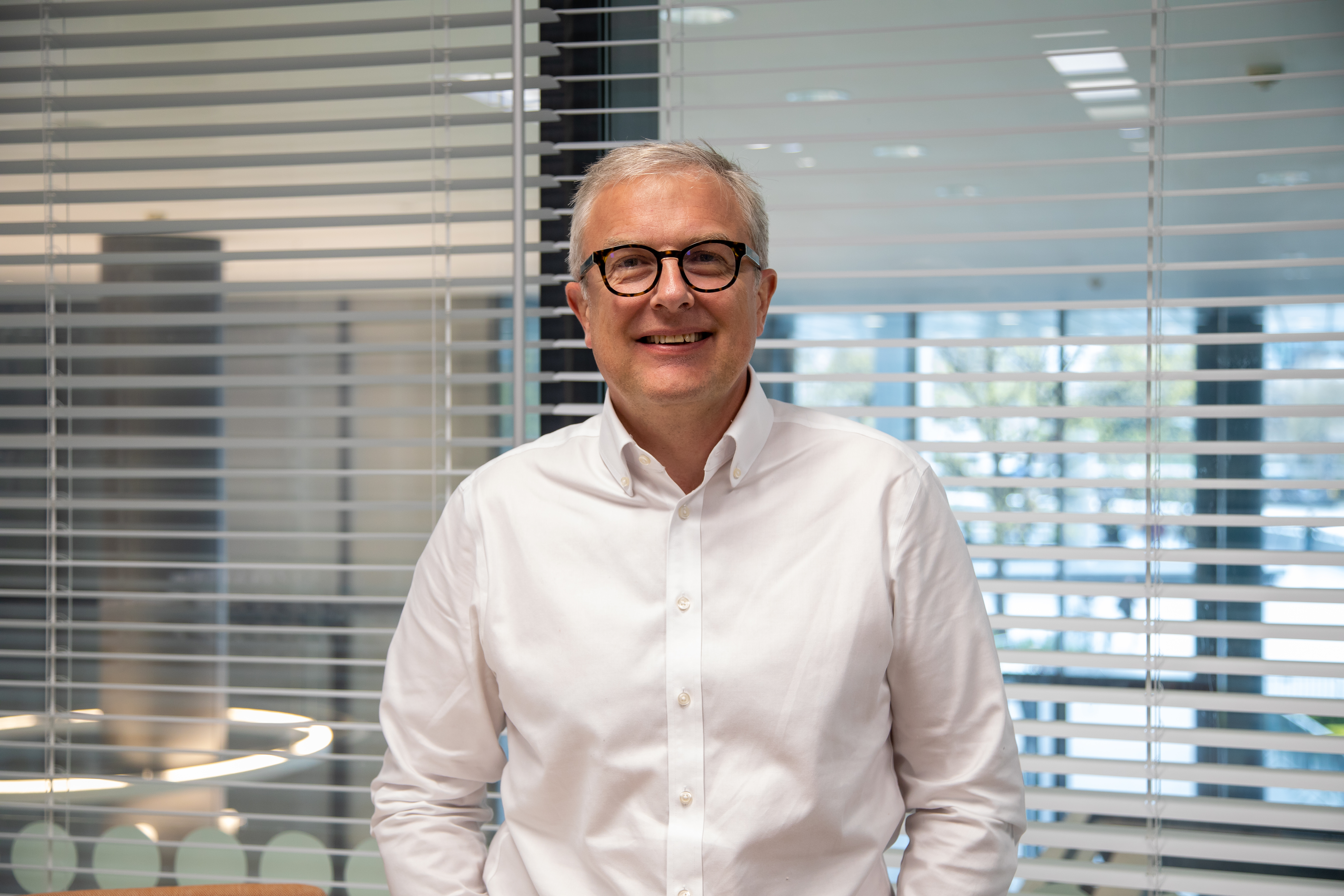
Lawrence Slade, Chief Executive of the ENA in April 2023.

== Structure ==
ENA member companies are:

- National Grid
- UK Power Networks
- Scottish and Southern Energy
- Northern Powergrid
- SP Energy Networks
- SP Electricity North West
- Northern Ireland Electricity Networks
- ESB Networks
- BUUK
- Eclipse Power

(list last updated November 2026).

== Function ==
ENA's role is to provide a strategic focus for the energy networks sector by communicating key messages. All its work is underpinned by technical expertise—more than half the association's staff are specialist engineers. ENA's online catalogue contains hundreds of reference documents relating to cables, contactor gear, electrical and mechanical composites, overhead transmissions and distribution lines, switchgear, engineering recommendations and other information. The association also records faults, defects and safety information on behalf of the networks industry.

== See also ==
- Energy UK
- Office of Gas and Electricity Markets
- National Energy System Operator
