= Feolite =

Feolite is a type of iron oxide sintered into building blocks, which are then used for heat storage.

Feolite was developed in Great Britain.

== Characteristics ==
Feolite, one of many materials used for heat storage, being a solid, does not have any volumetric or pressure containment issues, but correspondingly does require the use of a transfer medium to then get the stored heat to the desired location.

The specific heat of feolite is 920.0 J·kg^{−1}·°C^{−1}, its density is 3,900 kg·m^{−3}, and its thermal conductivity is 2.1 W·m^{−1}·°C^{−1}.

Feolite may be used at temperatures up to 1000 °C (1832 F).

== History ==
Feolite was invented in 1969 by Electricity Association Technology, then called Electricity Council Research Centre.

Feolite was a registered trademark (Note: 21 May 1973 - TM: 268578) in Australia for all iron oxides for use in the manufacture of thermal storage units which has now lapsed, by Electricity Association Technology of the United Kingdom.

Heating systems with a storage component now widely use feolite as the storage core.

== Application ==
Blocks of feolite enclosing sheathed electric heating elements to form a heat storage core, surrounded by thermal insulation, are used in storage heaters and storage radiators. Because feolite blocks will conduct electricity, electric heating elements must be electrically insulated when used with feolite storage.

The typical heat exchange medium for feolite storage is air.

Feolite has been considered for use as a component for braking systems in railway rolling stock.
