= Association of Electricity Producers =

British trade association

- Abbreviation: AEP
- Formation: 1987
- Type: Trade association
- Legal status: Non-profit company
- Purpose: Electricity industry in the UK
- Headquarters: Regent Street; London, SW1; United Kingdom
- Region served: UK
- Chief Executive: David Porter OBE
- Affiliations: EURELECTRIC
- Staff: 12
- Website: AEP

The Association of Electricity Producers (AEP) was a trade association for the United Kingdom electricity market. It had approximately 90 members, including electricity generation companies and those offering support services.

== History ==
The association was founded in 1987 as the Association of Independent Electricity Producers, with the initial remit of lobbying the UK government's Department of Energy to remove restrictions on private companies operating within the electricity industry. The idea for the AIEP came from David Andrews who was an engineer promoting small scale Combined Heat and Power - mini- CHP who was frustrated by the blatant attempts of the then CEGB to manipulate the market against mini-CHP. He called the first meeting held at Orchard Partners in London, then also active in promoting CHP, with John Macadam of Orchard Partners and Martin Alder then of Wessex Water and Trevor Dooley of Electrical Review, who provided valuable initial publicity. Early on Andrews suggested that a contact, David Porter, who had a small desk top publishing business provide a newsletter – Porter went on to become the director and chief executive.

=== Electricity privatisation ===
This early goal, against the CEGB, was achieved with the passing of the Electricity Act in 1989, and the subsequent full privatisation of the industry (with the exception of nuclear power).

In 1995, recognising that little remained from which the organisation could be "independent", it changed its name to the Association of Electricity Producers. In 1999 it moved to its current offices in London. It used to be based further towards Pall Mall on Waterloo Place.

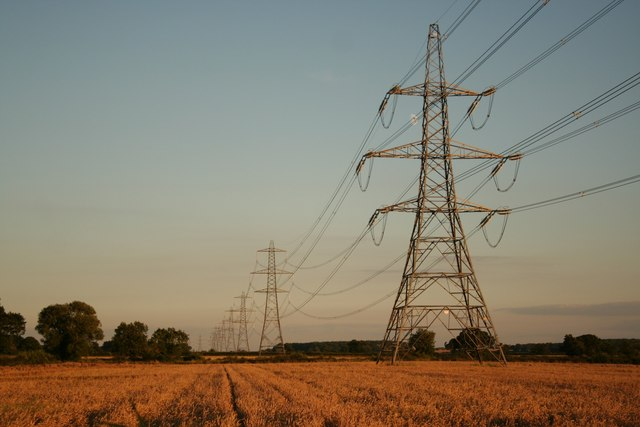
Transmission towers near Harby in Nottinghamshire

== Structure ==
The association employed 12 staff. Its president was Sir Michael Spicer former MP, and David Porter was its chief executive from 1991.

The UK electricity industry is worth £54 million, and directly employs 87,000 people.

== Merger ==
In April 2012, the Association of Electricity Producers merged with the Energy Retail Association and the UK Business Council for Sustainable Energy to become Energy UK.
