= Economy 7 =

Differential tariff

Economy 7 is a differential tariff provided by United Kingdom electricity suppliers that uses base load generation to provide cheap off-peak electricity during the night.

Houses using the Economy 7 tariff require a special electricity meter which provides two different readings - one for electricity used during the day, priced higher, and the other for the night, priced lower. The night (off-peak) period lasts for a total of seven hours, hence the name; however it may not be a continuous period, as it may alternate between the two prices during the night.

The term was coined by Jon Marshall. The first mention of Economy 7 is in 1978:

A new off-peak tariff known as the 'Economy 7' tariff was introduced in October [1978]. It featured a seven-hour night rate some 20 per cent cheaper than most night-time tariffs, made possible by economies in the night-time operation of the system.

In more recent years the difference between day and night rates has become smaller, with a reduction of about 33% (though dependent on the supplier). The Economy 7 tariff results in either or both of an increased standing (fixed) charge or increased daytime rate.

== Timing and switchover ==
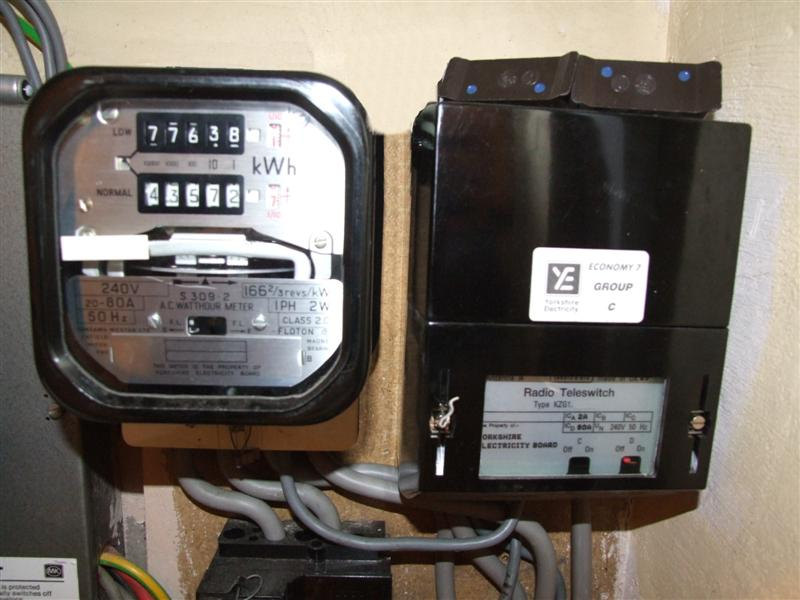
Economy 7 Meter and Teleswitcher

Appliances such as night storage heaters and hot water boilers are often on a separate circuit which is switched on only when the night rate is activated, however any electrical appliance on an ordinary circuit during this period also runs at the lower rate of billing. Some appliances such as dishwashers and washing machines include timers to allow them to be set to run during times when the night rate is active, but are connected to a normal circuit.

In newer houses, a digital meter automatically switches to record both ranges.

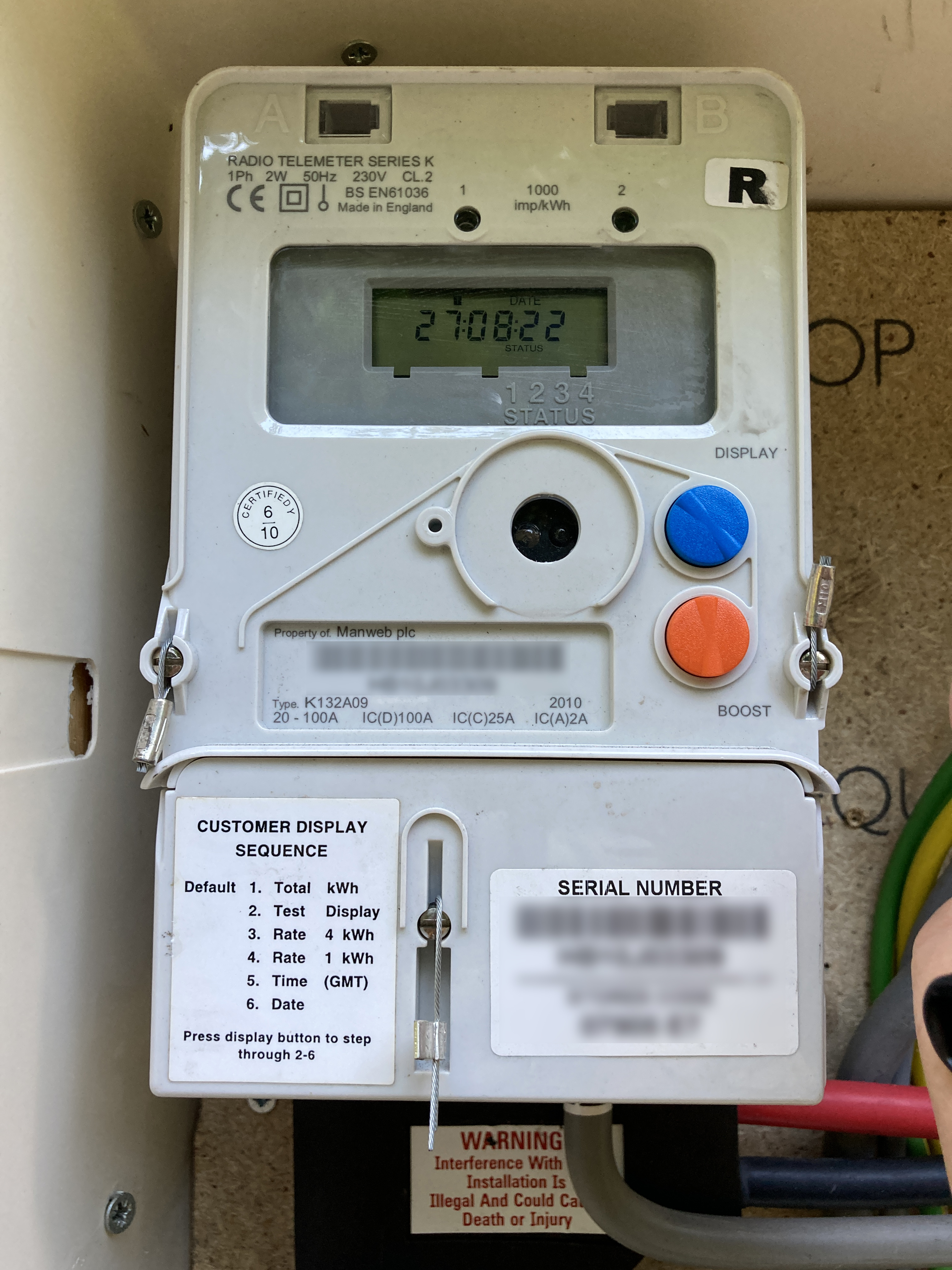
Modern digital dual-rate Economy 7 meter with built-in timeswitch

The specific times when Economy 7 applies vary between different regions, seasons, and sometimes individual meters. For example, the seven-hour period might start at 1:30 am during British Summer Time or 12:30 am during Greenwich Mean Time (winter). Some regions use radio teleswitching to control consumers' systems and vary the timing. This uses data superimposed on the 198 kHz long wave signal that was also used by BBC Radio 4, however this service was discontinued on 30 June 2026, when the 198 kHz network from all three of its source transmitters, that being Droitwich in Worcestershire, England, as well as Westerglen and Burghead in Scotland, was officially shut down permanently.

== Pricing ==
Electricity supply in the United Kingdom is deregulated and the several providers offer different tariffs, much as telephone or internet service providers do. Economy 7 can offer some consumers savings, but a careful analysis should be done. For example, if the price is double the normal tariff during the 'day' period, and half the normal during the 'night' period, then to break even the consumer would need to use over two-thirds of their energy during the 'night' period. Typically this holds true when electricity rather than gas is used for domestic heating and hot water, or, in some cases, if the supply is used to charge an electric vehicle overnight. An Economy 7 tariff can end up costing significantly more than a standard tariff without restructuring current energy usage.

== Similar tariffs ==
- White Meter is a very similar product used mainly in Scotland. The traditional setup offers up to eight and half hours of off-peak electricity overnight. Newer variants are also available which offer an overnight charging period for storage heating that is automatically varied to take account of forecast temperatures for the following day.
- Economy 10 offers ten hours of off-peak electricity spread over a 24-hour period.
- TwinHeat is a product offered by Scottish Power in North Wales and Merseyside which offers four hours of off-peak electricity overnight and three during the afternoon. Originally introduced as 'Menter' in the early 1990s, the product was designed to avoid the need for expensive supply network upgrades in rural Mid Wales by spreading high local demand for electric heating across multiple off-peak periods.
- With the popularity of smart meters increasing in the 2010s, a variety of off-peak tariffs were introduced by different electricity supply companies.

== See also ==
- Economy 10
- Energy use and conservation in the United Kingdom
- Load balancing (electrical power)
