= Storage heater =

Electrical heater that stores thermal energy

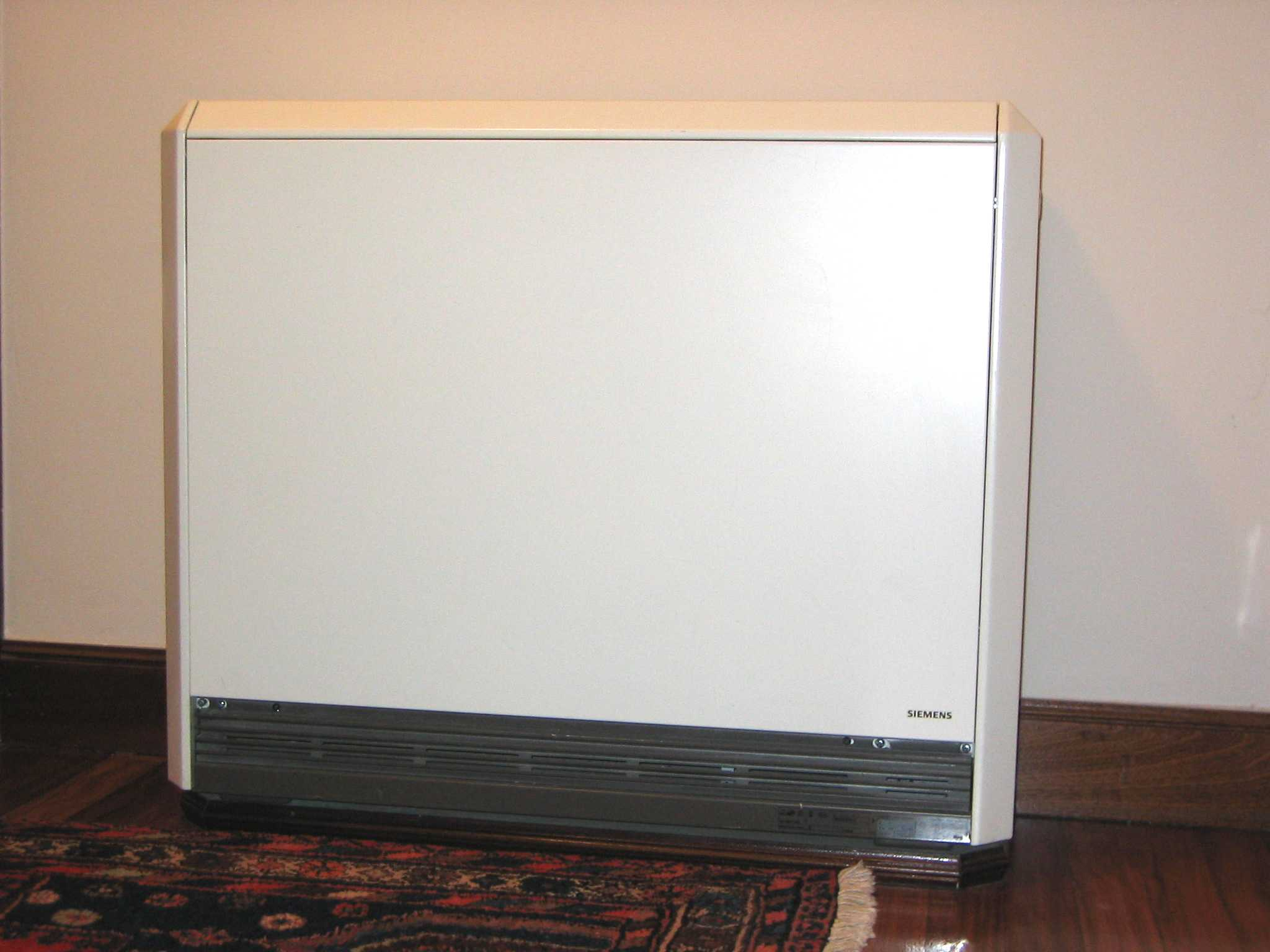
A domestic storage heater which uses cheap night time electricity to heat ceramic bricks which then release their heat during the day.

A storage heater, nightstore (New Zealand) or heat bank (Australia) is an electrical heater which stores thermal energy during the evening, or at night, when electricity is available at lower cost, and releases the heat during the day as required. Alternatively, solar storage heaters are designed to store solar energy as heat, to be released during the night or other periods where it is required, often making it more cost effective than selling surplus electricity to the grid and buying it back at night.

== Principle of operation ==
Storage heaters are typically composed of clay bricks or other ceramic material (grog), of concrete walls, or of water containers. There are also special materials such as feolite. This material serves as a heat storage medium. There are electrical heating elements embedded in the material which can be switched on to heat the storage medium and thus to store energy.

The stored heat is given off continuously (through thermal radiation and convection). To speed up the heat transfer, storage heaters may come equipped with mechanical fans that can move air through the heater; see the section on fan-assisted storage heaters.

== Types of storage heater ==
=== High heat retention storage heaters ===
High heat retention storage heaters (HHRSH) are the newest and most advanced storage heaters on the market. High heat retention storage heaters are able to retain more heat than traditional storage heaters, with a minimum of 45% heat retention 24 hours after a full charge. This significantly reduces the heat wasted during the day, and is achieved through improved insulation. High heat retention storage heaters also include smart controls and monitor climatic conditions to estimate future heat demand, making them much more responsive to changes in their environment than traditional storage heaters. All high heat retention storage heaters are also Lot 20 compliant, in line with the EcoDesign regulations which came into force on 1 January 2018.

== Regulations ==
Lot 20 is an EU legislation that was designed to remove inefficient heating technologies from the market and reduce the energy used by products that heat our homes. The goal of the legislation is to achieve the UK's overall carbon reduction targets and has been in place since 1 January 2018. It states that all installed electric heating products manufactured from 1 January 2018 must have an electronic thermostat with a 24-hour, 7-day timer with either adaptive start or an open window sensor. Storage heaters must include: an electronic heat charge control with room and/or outdoor temperature feedback or controlled by energy supplier, an electronic room temperature control plus week timer and a fan assisted output. Optional additional compliance features are distance control, adaptive start and open window detection. Non-compliant stock that was manufactured before this date may still be sold.

From an environmental health point of view, asbestos has been used in night storage heaters for many years, the fibers of which can get into the air and pose considerable negative health impact.

== Application ==
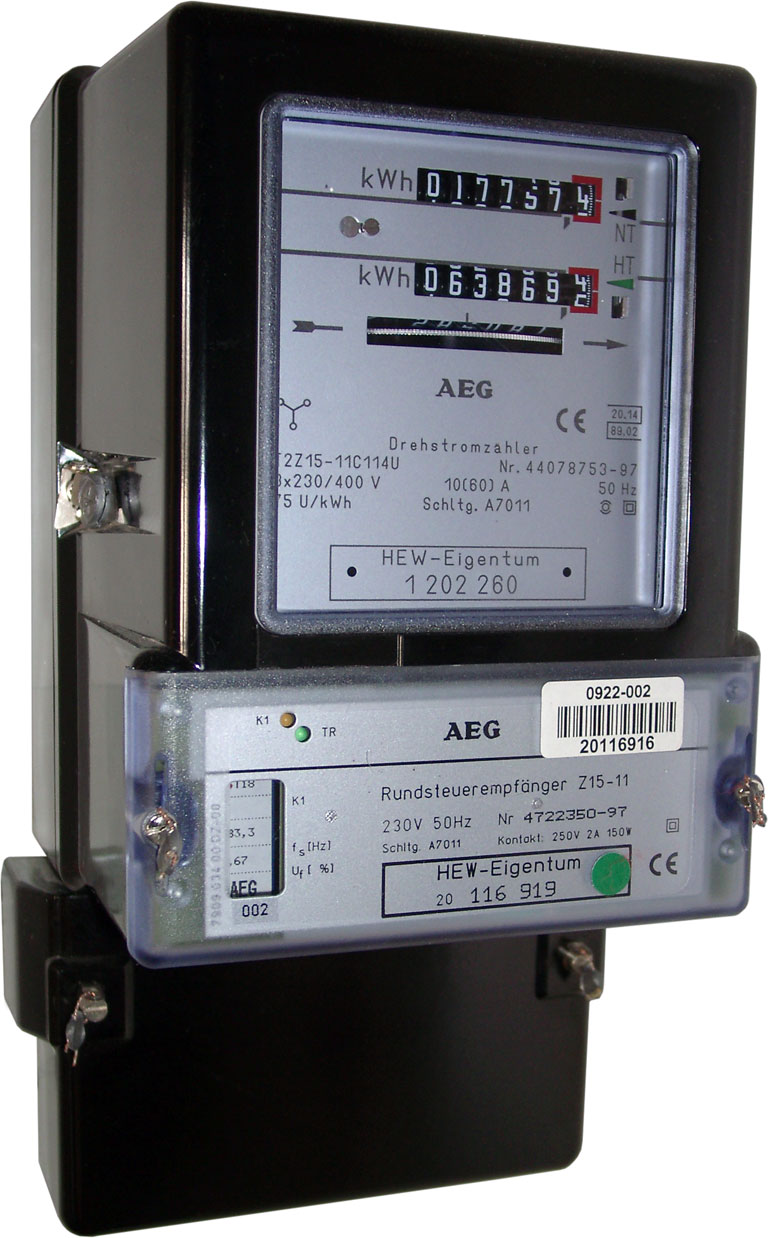
A two-tariff electricity meter which records separately the electricity used during the off-peak period so that it can be billed at a lower rate.

Storage heaters are usually used in conjunction with a two-tariff electricity meter which records separately the electricity used during the off-peak period so that it can be billed at a lower rate. In order to enjoy the lower rates, the house must be on a special electricity tariff. In most countries, storage heaters are only economical (compared to other forms of heating) when used with such a special tariff. In the United Kingdom the Economy 7 tariff is appropriate.

Storage heaters usually have two controls: a charge control (often called "input"), which controls the amount of heat stored, and the draught control (often called "output"), which controls the rate at which heat is released. These controls may be controlled by the user, or may operate automatically once the user selects the target room temperature on a thermostat.

Storage heaters may also incorporate an electric heater (utilizing either resistance heaters or heat pumps), which can be used to increase heat output. Such added heating, if it is resistance heating, is expensive, as it occurs during the high-tariff time of day.

== Comparison to other heating systems ==
=== Advantages ===
- Storage heaters, while often still more expensive than equivalent gas- or oil-fired heating systems, are cheaper than running the same amount of electrical heating using electricity at regular daytime rates.
- Users of gas central heating and some other systems often turn off the heating during the night as an economy measure, with the result that the house is cold at night and early morning; but because night storage heaters are on at night, the house is still warm at those times.
- Using storage heaters allows houses to be sited in areas where natural-gas distribution systems are not available, without requiring the homeowners to pay higher daytime electrical-heating bills.
- The capital cost of night storage heating is relatively low, and installation is far easier than the initial installation of gas-fired boilers, piping and radiators, or electric heat pumps. This is an important advantage when renovating old buildings without existing central heating.
- As compared to gas central heating systems, night storage heaters have next to no maintenance costs.

=== Disadvantages ===
- Heat is lost from the heater while charging overnight. The room is warm in the morning, but this is because it has wastefully been heated all night.
- The heat stored during the night will be released into the living area during the next day, regardless of need (due to the inevitable heat transfer through the storage heater's insulation). Thus if the homeowner is unexpectedly absent that day (and therefore does not need the house to be warmed) or is only at home for a small part of the day, the heat has already been purchased and is already there, and eventually comes out.
- The storage heater can only heat with the energy stored the night before. Thus if the system was switched off or if the charge control was set too low, there may not be sufficient energy to heat the rooms, and this can only be corrected for the next day. This is a problem for example when the weather turns cold unexpectedly, or when returning from a vacation late at night, or users simply not thinking to change the settings because they are at a comfortable temperature. Some heaters alleviate this problem by also allowing heating during the day, but this is typically expensive (because the electricity is charged at full rate). Even under the best of circumstances it can be difficult to accurately judge how to set the thermostats as setting them too low overnight can cause the heater to be having no perceived effect while setting them at maximum will increase the cost of running them. Similarly in systems where every heater must be set individually, incorrectly setting one room's heater can make the whole house feel too cold.
- Many users may not fully understand the controls. A common error is leaving the output (or boost) control open at night, so that the heaters dissipate heat when they should be storing it, with a consequent increase in electricity consumption and cost. Alternatively they may set the input control to minimum at night instead of the output, which can mean there is no heat at all for the next day.
- Sizing a storage heater is a compromise between the maximum expected cold-spell intensity and duration, and the cost and space requirement of the heater. If the heater is too large, its cost will be excessive and it will impact on the building's available area; if too small, the cost of supplemental (daytime) electrical heating will be excessive.
- Storage heaters are very heavy and somewhat bulky, due to the material used to store heat. They typically take up more floor space than the radiators used in most other heating systems.
- In most countries, electricity costs 2-3 times as much as gas or oil per unit of heat (joule or kWh), and the reduced off-peak tariffs and higher delivery efficiency do not fully overcome this difference.
- When the fan (if included) is used to speed up heat transfer, the air circulation will increase the amount of airborne dust in the heated room. This can be a problem for people with allergies. Therefore, central heating is a better source of heat for allergy sufferers. This can be avoided by not using the fan, but then it is more difficult to regulate the heat transfer, which occurs by radiation and natural convection as with normal central heating radiators.

== Using storage heaters ==
Storage heaters can be cost-effective if used properly, but control may be trickier than fuel-fired systems.

=== Power switches ===
Storage heaters generally require two power circuits, one for on-peak and one for off-peak electricity, and two power switches, which are switched off during the summer when heat is not required. During other months the off-peak switch can be left on at all times, with the on-peak switch being used when insufficient energy has been stored during off-peak times. The amount of heat that is stored can be altered using the controls on the storage heater unit. Normally the on-peak will have a fuse as it is part of another circuit. The off-peak will just be a switch as it has a dedicated circuit. Some installations work on off-peak electricity only and cannot be switched on during the day.

=== Basic controls ===
Basic storage heaters have an input switch, and an output switch, called heat boost on some models.

The position of the input switch may be changed to reflect how cold the next day is predicted to be. The input switch is normally thermostatic, cutting off the charge when the room reaches a certain temperature overnight. The exact setting needed will depend on the size of the storage heater, the desired room temperature during the day, the number of hours that this needs to be maintained, and the room's rate of heat loss under a given set of circumstances. Some experimenting may be needed to find the relationship between forecast outside temperature and best input setting for a particular room. Most storage heater users follow simpler guidelines; for example, in the middle of winter, it is often appropriate to turn the input switch to its maximum setting. There is no need to touch the input switch on a daily basis if the same sort of weather prevails for weeks at a time. There is no need to touch the input switch during the day, as storage heaters only use electricity at night.

The output switch may require attention throughout the day. Before going to bed, the operator should switch the output to its minimum setting. This keeps as much heat in the bricks as possible. Enough will leak out into the room to make it warm in the morning. Only in exceptionally cold circumstances will the operator require output overnight. The operator may wish to slowly increase the output switch during the day to try to maintain the temperature in the house. Increasing the output will allow the heat to convect out of the heater. If the house is empty during the day, the output should be left at a minimum all day and then switched up when returning to the house in order to let more heat escape.

Many storage heaters also have a mechanically-controlled automatic output switch. In this case, if the manual output switch is not set to minimum overnight, the damper will automatically close (as if the output switch had been set to minimum), and then the damper will re-open after a time delay; this time delay is measured by the gradual drop in the heater's core temperature, and is therefore longer if the core temperature started higher due to more charge. The delay can also be biased by the output switch's setting. Some output switches that are set up this way are marked "early" and "late" as well as "closed" and "open"; the minimum "closed" setting corresponds with "early" and the maximum "open" setting corresponds with "late". These output switches can be controlled manually by ensuring they are closed at night and opened when desired, or they can be left to automatic operation by not closing at night.

=== Thermostatic controls ===
A thermostatic storage heater will automatically regulate the temperature in a room throughout the day. However, the operator may wish to switch the thermostatic switch to the minimum setting overnight to lower the room temperature. If the room is empty during the day, it is better to keep the thermostat at the minimum setting and then increase the setting when the room is occupied in the evening. Some thermostatic heaters also make use of on-peak electricity when there is not enough stored heat to maintain the requested temperature; the user may wish to be aware of this and lower the settings.

=== Fan-assisted storage heaters ===
Fan-assisted storage heaters employ an electric fan to drive air through the heater rather than relying on convection. The fan is usually controlled by a thermostat which allows the user to set the desired room temperature. The use of the fan means these heaters can be insulated more than other models, and therefore lose less heat due to heat transfer at times when heat is not required (such as when the room is not occupied, or at night).

== Environmental aspects ==
In common with other forms of direct electric heating, storage heaters are not necessarily environmentally friendly because the source of electricity may be generated using fossil fuels, with up to two-thirds of energy in the fuel lost at the power station and in transmission losses. In Sweden the use of direct electric heating has been restricted since the 1980s for this reason, and there are plans to phase it out entirely—see Oil phase-out in Sweden—while Denmark and Germany have banned the installation of electric space heating in new buildings for similar reasons (though in Germany the ban was lifted in 2013).

In the UK, a storage heater earns a "Poor" rating for Environmental Performance on an Energy Performance Certificate. However many progressive countries are developing their electricity generating system, principally, to incorporate "greener", more sustainable and renewable energy sources; so how "green" a storage heater system is would in principle depend on how the electricity used is generated. Of course this argument applies to all forms of electric heating, but the ability of a storage heater system to use electricity at times when, for example, wind generated electricity could not otherwise be used, may in conjunction with a smart grid give storage heating a new role in the future.

In some countries, the current design of the electrical generating system may result in a surplus of electricity generation capacity from base load power stations during off-peak periods, and storage heaters may then be able to make use of this surplus to increase the net efficiency of the system as a whole. However, future changes in supply and demand—for example as a result of energy conservation measures or a more responsive generating system—may then reverse this situation, with storage heaters preventing a reduction in the national base load. Other technologies may incorporate demand response electronics to sense when there is a change in supply and demand. Thereby, they ensure that these loads only use off-peak electricity. Further advances in supply technology could provide for a more bespoke 'supply and demand' tariff system to make smart grid sensing technologies like dynamic demand a more viable financial prospect.

Compared to other forms of electric heating, storage heaters are cheaper to run and they impose lower peak loads. The highest peak loads come from instantaneous electric heating, such as immersion water heaters, which create heavy loads for short durations, although instantaneous water heaters may use less electricity overall. High-efficiency ground source heat pumps are able to use up to 66% less electricity than storage heaters in heating by recovering heat from the ground, and are regarded as preferable even though they use electricity throughout the day. Air source heat pumps give similar efficiency increases and are generally easier and cheaper to install for domestic use. These are not to be confused with air conditioning (A/C) heat pumps which provide cooling with an increased carbon footprint and are now considered to be an environmental liability in some, (in particular hotter climate), countries.

Where alternatives to electricity exist, hot-water central heating systems can use water heated in or close to the building using high-efficiency condensing boilers, biofuels, heat pumps or district heating. Ideally hot water heating should be used. This can be converted in the future to use other technologies such as solar panels, so also providing future-proofing. In the case of new buildings, low-energy buildings such as those built to the Passive House standard can eliminate almost all the need for conventional space heating systems.

== See also ==
- Central heating
- Electric heating
- Heater (types of heaters)
- Heat capacity
- Thermal storage
