= Charge control =

Charge control is a technology that lets an electric utility control, in real time, the charging of a gridable (plug-in) vehicle, such as a plug-in hybrid (PHEV) or a battery electric vehicle (BEV). Through charge control, the utility is able to postpone charging of the vehicle during time of peak demand. Additionally, this technology may enable the owner and the power company to track the vehicle's usage and performance, while on the road and while charging.

== Charge control advantages ==
- During times of peak demand, the electric utility prefers to reduce the demand, rather than turning on additional (dirtier and more expensive) power plants. In places that subscribe to smart power grid services, the electric utility shuts off appliances such as air conditioners until the peak demand is over. Similarly, charge control allows the electric utility to postpone charging until the peak demand is over. Charge control is not as far reaching as V2G (a technology that allows the power company to buy energy back from a plug-in car) but is very effective because it is less expensive to implement than V2G.
- The hardware used in charge control also monitors the vehicle (when driving or when plugged-in). As a side benefit, that information is available, through the web, to both the electric utility and the owner, for the purpose of tracking and optimizing the performance of the vehicle.
- Eventually, the electric utility may offer better pricing to owners of charge control equipped vehicles.

== Comparison to V2G ==
In both V2G and charge control, the electric utility can control the power flow between a plug-in vehicle and the power grid. However, in charge control power only flows from the grid to the vehicle, while in V2G power can flow in both directions.

== Peak load leveling ==
Disabling charging in charge control vehicles helps balance the loading on the power grid by "valley filling" (charging at night when demand is low) and "peak shaving" (not charging when demand is high). It can enable utilities new ways to provide regulation services (keeping voltage and frequency stable).

== See also ==
- Vehicle-to-grid
- Distributed generation
