= IEEE Smart Grid =

- Founded: January 2010
- Type: Professional Organization
- Purpose: Smart Grid, Power Transmission and Distribution, Renewable Energy, Communications, Electric Vehicles
- Location: Piscataway, New Jersey
- Origins: Global initiative launched by IEEE
- Region served: Worldwide
- Method: Industry standards, Conferences, Publications
- Key people: Wanda Reder, IEEE Smart Grid Chair; Massoud Amin, IEEE Smart Grid Newsletter Chair; J. Roberto de Marco, IEEE Smart Grid World Forum Steering Committee Chair
- Website: smartgrid.ieee.org

IEEE Smart Grid is an initiative launched by IEEE to help provide expertise and guidance for individuals and organizations involved in the modernization and optimization of the power grid, better known as the "smart grid". IEEE Smart Grid encompasses an array of activities, including development of new smart grid-related standards, best practices, publications, and conferences and educational opportunities.

== History ==
IEEE's involvement in the emerging smart grid reaches back to its development of power and energy standards. In 2007, the Energy Independence and Security Act (EISA) was signed into law by President George W. Bush. EISA directed that under the auspices of the US Department of Energy (US DOE), the National Institute of Standards and Technology (NIST) be tasked with the development of a framework including protocols and model standards for information management to achieve interoperability of smart grid devices and systems. In Title XIII, Section 1305(a)(2) of EISA, IEEE was named as one of the Standard Setting Organizations (SSOs) whose work would be vital in the development of standards for NIST's Smart Grid Interoperability Framework. As part of the first phase of NIST's Smart Grid Interoperability Framework, 16 initial standards were offered for adoption, including three developed by IEEE: C37.118, IEEE 1547, and IEEE 1686-2007.

In May 2009, IEEE announced the launch of a new smart grid effort targeted to the power engineering, communications, and information technology disciplines. The first project in this effort, titled "The IEEE Standard 2030 Guide for Smart Grid Interoperability of Energy Technology and Information Technology Operation with the Electric Power System (EPS) and End-Use Applications and Loads" (IEEE 2030) established a knowledge framework for understanding and defining smart grid interoperability of the electric power system with end use applications, setting the stage for future smart grid-related standards.

In January 2010, IEEE launched the first phase of IEEE Smart Grid, a new global initiative designed to bring together the organization's broad array of resources to provide expertise and guidance for those involved in Smart Grid worldwide. Later that year, IEEE published inaugural editions of two new publications, cross-discipline archival journals entitled IEEE Transactions on Smart Grid, and IEEE Transactions on Sustainable Energy.

== Current work ==
IEEE's approach to the smart grid is to view it as a large "System of Systems" wherein individual smart grid domains based on the NIST Smart Grid Conceptual Model are expanded into three layers: Power and Energy, Communications, and IT/Computer. IEEE considers the Communications and IT/Computer layers to be enabling infrastructure for the Power and Energy layer.

=== IEEE Smart Grid Portal ===
As part of the first phase of IEEE Smart Grid, IEEE unveiled the IEEE Smart Grid Portal in January 2010. As originally designed, the site served as an online clearinghouse providing smart grid-focused news, information, commentary, videos, and event information for a broad audience including business and industry, academic, and government users, as well as consumers. The portal is also home to the initiative's monthly digest, the IEEE Smart Grid Newsletter.

The IEEE Smart Grid Portal was relaunched in September 2011. The redesigned site included improved search capabilities and other new features, such as a broader selection of video interviews and Q&A's with industry experts, business leaders, and researchers. It also facilitated greater user access to approved and in-development IEEE smart grid standards and an expanded conference calendar.

=== Standards ===
IEEE continues to work closely with NIST on its standards roadmap and conformance testing/certification framework for the smart grid. The organization also collaborates with other global standards bodies to effectively facilitate standards coordination and to ensure the intensifying smart grid movement’s success.

There are more than 100 standards that have been approved or in development relating to the smart grid. Among the broad number of systems and technologies addressed by these standards are broadband over power line, cyber security, distributed energy resources, Distributed Network Protocol (DNP3), and Greenhouse gas emissions credits, among others.

==== Sampling of Approved IEEE Smart Grid Standards ====
- IEEE 1547-2003 Standard for Interconnecting Distributed Resources with Electric Power Systems
- IEEE 1675-2008 Standard for Broadband over Power Line Hardware
- IEEE 1686-2007 Standard for Substation Intelligent Electronic Devices (IEDs) Cyber Security Capabilities
- IEEE 1815-2010 Standard for Electric Power Systems Communications—Distributed Network Protocol (DNP3)
- IEEE 2030-2011 Guide for Smart Grid Interoperability of Energy Technology and Information Technology Operation with the Electric Power System (EPS), End-Use Applications, and Loads

==== Sampling of Proposed IEEE Smart Grid Standards ====
- IEEE P1377 Draft Standard for Utility Industry Metering Communication Protocol Application Layer (End Device Data Tables)
- IEEE P1547.6 Draft Recommended Practice For Interconnecting Distributed Resources With Electric Power Systems Distribution Secondary Networks
- IEEE P1595 Draft Standard for Quantifying Greenhouse Gas Emission Credits from Small Hydro and Wind Power Projects, and for Grid Baseline Conditions
- IEEE P1613 Draft Standard Environmental and Testing Requirements for Communications Networking Devices Installed in Electric Power Substations
- IEEE P1797 Draft Guide for Design and Application of Solar Technology in Commercial Power Generating Stations

=== Events ===
IEEE Smart Grid and its participating societies sponsor and host major conferences, symposiums, and other events on a global basis. Dedicated to providing a forum for the sharing of ideas and information about smart grid concepts, deployments, and technology advancements, IEEE Smart Grid events generally span several days in length and attract attendees from around the world. Conference programs often consist of educational tracks with keynote speeches, panel discussions, and roundtables led by industry notables, researchers, engineers, academics, policymakers, and other key stakeholders.

Among IEEE Smart Grid flagship events are its Innovative Smart Grid Technologies (ISGT) Conference, SmartGridComm, and Smart Grid World Forum. Other recent major IEEE Smart Grid events include:

==== 2010 ====
- Asia-Pacific Power & Energy Engineering Conference (APPEEC) 2010, sponsored by the IEEE Power & Energy Society and centered on best practices in power generation, transmission, and distribution, and conventional and renewable energy
- International Symposium on power-line communications and its Applications (ISPLC) 2010, designed to stimulate discussions on electrical power distribution wires as a viable communication channel
- Conference On Innovative Technologies For An Efficient & Reliable Electricity Supply (ITERES) 2010, focused on examining the development of components for and planning and implementing of the new Smart/Resilient Electric Grid and integration of the various existing and alternative/renewable electric power system components

==== 2011 ====
- Power Systems Conference & Exhibition (PSCE) 2011, a plenary session dedicated to presenting power system tutorials and discussing the theme "The Next Generation Grid – Putting It All Together"
- IEEE Technology Time Machine (TTM) 2011, a high level thought leadership conference about revolutionary technology platforms that will change lives during the next decade
- PowerTech 2011, IEEE Power & Energy Society Europe's anchor conference, offering a platform for electric power engineering scientists and engineers to share knowledge, ideas, and results of scientific work

IEEE Smart Grid is also home to smaller workshops, sessions, and continuing education courses, like the IEEE PES "Plain Talk About the Electric Power System" series, which are hosted by various societies and their chapters.

=== Publications ===
Through its Smart Grid Initiative, societies, working groups, committees and sub-committees, IEEE has published nearly 5,000 papers, manuscripts, guides, and other documents relating to the smart grid, including:

==== IEEE Smart Grid Newsletter ====
In January 2011, IEEE unveiled the IEEE Smart Grid Newsletter, a monthly electronic digest. The publication's content focuses on practical and technical information, as well as commentary and opinion on emerging smart grid technologies, new standards, global deployments, and other smart grid-related subject matter. Contributors include industry leaders, prominent researchers and academics, and advocates and policy experts. Dr. S. Massoud Amin, Director and Honeywell/H.W. Sweatt Chair, Technological Leadership Institute, and Professor of Electrical and Computer Engineering, University of Minnesota, is the publication's Chairman, and William Sweet, Emeritus News Editor, IEEE Spectrum, is its Managing Editor.

==== IEEE Transactions on Smart Grid ====
Intended to disseminate smart grid research results on energy generation, transmission, distribution and delivery, IEEE Transactions on Smart Grid offers original research on smart grid theories, technologies, design, policies, and implementation. It also accepts manuscripts on smart grid design and implementation, and evaluation of energy systems involving smart grid technologies and applications. Published quarterly, IEEE Transactions on Smart Grid is jointly produced by multiple IEEE societies, including its Computational Intelligence Society, Communications Society, Computer Society, Control Systems Society, Industry Applications Society, Industrial Electronics Society, Instrumentation and Measurement Society, Power Electronics Society, Power & Energy Society, and Signal Processing Society. In August 2011, the journal's "Protecting Smart Grid Automation Systems Against Cyberattacks," authored by IEEE members Dong Wei and Yan Lu became the three millionth document in IEEE Xplore, IEEE's extensive digital library. Mohammad Shahidehpour is the current Editor-in-Chief of IEEE Transactions on Smart Grid.

==== IEEE Transactions on Sustainable Energy ====
A quarterly, cross-discipline journal featuring original research, IEEE Transactions on Sustainable Energy focuses on sustainable energy generation, transmission, distribution and delivery. Manuscripts concentrating on sustainable energy power systems design, implementation, and evaluations, as well as surveys of existing work are also accepted for consideration. Launched in April 2010, IEEE Transactions on Sustainable Energy is jointly published by IEEE's Industry Applications Society, Industrial Electronics Society, Instrumentation and Measurement Society, IEEE Oceanic Engineering Society, Power Electronics Society, Power & Energy Society, Photonics Society, and the Society on Social Implications of Technology. The journal's current Editor-in-Chief is Saifur Rahman, Joseph Loring Professor of ECE at Virginia Polytechnic Institute and State University (Virginia Tech).

== Participating IEEE societies ==
IEEE is home to 38 technical Societies encompassing a large array of disciplines and specialized fields of interest such as aerospace and electronic systems, medicine and biology engineering, magnetics, robotics, and vehicular technology. Many of these societies are engaged in smart grid-related work, however, due to their specific areas of expertise, several have emerged as leaders in smart grid technology development and promotion:

=== IEEE Communications Society ===
The IEEE Communications Society (IEEE ComSoc) is an IEEE professional society of more than 8,800 communications industry professionals. As part of its goal to foster original work in all aspects of communications science, engineering, and technology, IEEE ComSoc sponsors a variety of publications, conferences, educational programs, local activities, and technical committees. IEEE ComSoc is a key stakeholder in IEEE Smart Grid, sponsoring a variety of related standards like IEEE 1901-2010 and conferences like the IEEE International Symposium on Power Line Communications and its Applications (ISPLC) and SmartGridComm, one of IEEE Smart Grid's flagship events. Along with a number of its sister societies, IEEE ComSoc jointly publishes IEEE Transactions on Smart Grid.

=== IEEE Computer Society ===
The IEEE Computer Society is a professional society for computing professionals and researchers based in Washington, DC. With 85,000 members worldwide, it is the largest IEEE society. The group offers a variety of resources, including certification programs, printed and electronic books and journals, and conferences and events. The IEEE Computer Society is an active participant in IEEE Smart Grid, through the sponsorship of smart grid-applicable standards and practices, like IEEE 1471 and IEEE 42010-2011, and events such as ISGT. It is also one of the publishing societies for IEEE Transactions on Smart Grid.

=== IEEE Power & Energy Society ===
The IEEE Power & Energy Society (IEEE PES) is home to 28,000 electric power energy professionals. Among the technical subject matter addressed by IEEE PES are electric power research, as well as system design, installation, and operation. The society aims to ensure the safe, sustainable, economic and reliable conversion, generation, transmission, distribution, storage and usage of electric energy, including its measurement and control. IEEE PES is one of the main proponents of IEEE Smart Grid, sponsoring numerous smart grid-related standards, such as IEEE 487-2007, IEEE 1138-2009, IEEE 1222-2003, and IEEE 1615-2007. The group frequently sponsors smart grid-related events on a national, international, and regional basis, including ISGT, IEEE Power Systems Conference & Exposition (PSCE), and the IEEE PES Plain Talk series.

=== IEEE Society on Social Implications of Technology ===
The IEEE Society on Social Implications of Technology (SSIT) focuses on the environmental, health, and safety implications of technology. Among the topics addressed by its 2,000 global members are ethics and professional responsibility, the history of electrotechnology, public policy, and technology-related societal issues. IEEE SSIT members are generally professionals from multiple disciplines, including energy, information technology, and telecommunications. The group publishes IEEE Technology and Society Magazine, a quarterly journal. IEEE SSIT sponsors or contributes regularly to IEEE Smart Grid standards and events, and is one of the publishing societies of IEEE Transactions on Sustainable Energy.

== Influence and impact ==
Many of the participating IEEE Smart Grid members have had demonstrable impact on the smart grid ecosystem. Often called upon as smart grid experts by the media, members appear frequently in magazines and newsletters such as Electric Energy Online, Electric Light & Power magazine, and FierceSmartGrid, as well as on broadcast programs like NPR's Science Friday and blogtalkradio. greentechgrid unveiled "The Networked Grid 100: Movers and Shakers of the Smart Grid" in February 2010, naming IEEE Fellow, John D. McDonald, as one of their listees. In November 2011, FierceEnergy magazine announced its inaugural "Power Players -- The 15 Most Influential People in Energy" list, which included four IEEE Smart Grid members: IEEE Life Member Dick DeBlasio, IEEE Fellow Erich Gunther, McDonald, and IEEE Computer Society member, Andres Carvallo.

IEEE Smart Grid members have also had impact in other areas, including public policy. In May 2004, Erich Gunther was appointed by the US DOE as a member of its GridWise Architecture Council (GWAC), and currently serves as its chair. IEEE Smart Grid member, John D. McDonald, was selected as the inaugural member of the US DOE Electric Advisory Committee, which he served on during 2008. He was followed by IEEE Smart Grid Chair, Wanda Reder, who was appointed to the committee in 2010.

On July 1, 2010, McDonald along with Dr. George W. Arnold, National Coordinator for Smart Grid, NIST; Mason W. Emnett, Associate Director of The Office of Energy Policy and Innovation, Federal Energy Regulatory Commission (FERC); Conrad Eustis, Director of Retail Technology Development, Portland General Electric; and Lillie Coney, Associate Director, Electronic Privacy Information Center were called upon to brief the U.S. House of Representatives’ Subcommittee on Technology and Innovation, House Committee on Science and Technology. At the hearing entitled "Smart Grid Architecture and Standards: Assessing Coordination and Progress", he provided testimony on the progress of standards for Smart Grid interoperability and cyber security, stating: "Also crucial to this undertaking are developing system architecture and standards that provide the essential foundation for bringing together the electrical and communications infrastructure, and for evolving technology to meet many and disparate needs. Both the IEEE through its Standards Association and NIST have already shown tremendous progress in these areas."

== See also ==
- Distributed Generation
- Energy Policy
- Intermittent Power Sources
- Renewables
- Smart Grid
- Smart Grids by Country
- Smart Meter
