= Wanda Reder =

American energy executive

Wanda K. Reder is an American energy executive, the president and chief executive officer of Reder Advisors, LLC, and the first female president of the IEEE Power & Energy Society.

== Education and career ==
Reder was an engineering student at South Dakota State University, where she graduated in 1986. She received a Master of Business Administration in 1990 from the University of St. Thomas (Minnesota).

She started working as an energy executive in 1987, for the Northern States Power Company. From 2000 to 2004 she worked as a vice president at Davies Consulting, Inc. and at Exelon. From 2004 to 2018 she worked for the S&C Electric Company, eventually becoming chief strategy officer there. In 2018 she became president and chief executive officer of Grid-X Partners, LLC, which later became Reder Advisors, LLC.

She was president of the IEEE Power & Energy Society from 2008 to 2009, its first female president.

== Recognition ==
Reder was named as an IEEE Fellow in 2012, "for leadership in power engineering implementation and workforce development". She was the 2014 recipient of the Richard M. Emberson Award of the IEEE Power & Energy Society, "for leadership in the IEEE Smart Grid program and in the continued growth of the IEEE Power and Energy Society, including the creation of its Scholarship Fund". The IEEE Power & Energy Society Wanda Reder Pioneer in Power Award has been given annually beginning in 2014 to a female senior member of the IEEE Power & Energy Society. It is named in honor of Reder.

Reder was elected to the National Academy of Engineering in 2016.
