= Smart grid policy of the United States =

Smart grid policy in the United States refers to legislation and other governmental orders influencing the development of smart grids in the United States.

== Background ==
The term smart grid describes a next-generation electric power system, that is classified by the increased use of communication and information technology in the generation, delivery, and consumption of electrical energy. For individual consumers, smart grid technology offers more control over electricity consumption. Typically, the goal is overall greater energy efficiency (for example, programming home appliances to run at specific times when electrical demand is lowest).

The reliability and efficiency of the electrical grid can be enhanced by implementing smart grid technologies. However, this will require modifications to the current electrical system, and advances towards smart grid adoption in the United States have been slow. Key federal legislation driving the development of smart grid-related technology for the American electrical system includes Title XIII of the Energy Independence and Security Act of 2007 (EISA). Further, smart grid regulations will help to further drive the adoption of smart grid technology in the United States.

== Timeline ==
Some milestones

- July 2003: DoE releases "Grid 2030" A National Vision for Electricity's Second 100 Years. The report calls for a gradual transition to Smart Grid technology
- August 8, 2005: Passage of the Energy Policy Act of 2005, which includes new power grid reliability standards and alternative energy incentive funding
- March 2007: DoE releases A Vision for the Modern Grid, with a call for an accelerated transition to a Smart Grid
- December 2007: Energy Independence and Security Act of 2007 (EISA) signed into law. NIST appointed to coordinate the development of Smart Grid Standards. The policy for implementation of a comprehensive smart grid in the United States was codified in Title IIV of the Energy Independence and Security Act of 2007 (EISA).
- June 2008: DoE workshop brings more than 140 government and industry representatives together to discuss EISA Smart Grid goals
- January 8, 2009: President-elect Barack Obama identifies transition to a Smart Grid as a high priority for his administration
- February 7, 2009: Under the guidance of President Barack Obama, Congress supplemented the Energy Independence and Security Act and the Administration acted to develop the Smart Grid. The Energy Independence and Security Act authorized demonstration projects for Smart Grid technologies. The landmark American Recovery and Reinvestment Act of 2009 added funds to the effort. The Department of Energy approved grants to several utilities to build the necessary infrastructure. (Rokach Unlocking...)
- March 19, 2009: FERC releases Smart Grid Policy — Proposed Policy Statement and Action Plan for public comment
- April 13, 2009: NIST names Dr. George W. Arnold as first National Coordinator for Smart Grid Interoperability
- April 28–29, 2009: Reston, Virginia, workshop to select first Interoperability Frameworks standards attracts 400 participants
- May 18, 2009: Secs. Chu and Locke announce increased funding for the development of Smart Grid Standards and demonstration projects and announce the selection of the first 16 proposed standards
- May 19–20, 2009: Stakeholder Summit held in Washington, DC
- September 2009: Target date for the release of Preliminary Roadmap for development of Interoperability Framework
- January 25, 2010: NIST releases: The NIST Interoperability Framework for the Smart Grid

== Energy Independence and Security Act of 2007 Title XIII ==
Title XIII of the Energy Independence and Security Act of 2007 (Pub.L. 110–140) is the only major piece of federal legislation that addresses the modernization of the United States’ electric utility transmission and distribution system by upgrading to the Smart Grid.

Smart Grid on a broad scale, refers to an advanced distribution system, which accommodates for the “flow of information from a customer’s meter in two directions: both inside the house to thermostats, appliances, and other devices, and from the house back to the utility”. Smart Grid is designed to support operational and energy measures such as smart meters and appliances, renewable energy resources, as well as energy efficiency resources.

The Department of Energy (DoE) is required by Section 1304 of the act to conduct Smart Grid research, development, and demonstration. In addition, the National Institute of Standards and Technology is to establish protocols and standards for Smart Grid equipment and systems. Smart Grid technology is subsidized by the creation of a program within the DoE that “reimburses 20% of qualifying Smart Grid investments”. On a state level, utilities providers are encouraged to employ Smart Grid technology and to recover Smart Grid investments through rates.

=== Section 1301: Statement of policy on modernization of electricity grid ===
The most comprehensive discussion of Smart Grid technology and its potential implementation in the United States is outlined in Title XIII of the Energy Independence and Security Act of 2007. This portion of the legislation states the policy position of the United States government to “support the modernization of the Nation’s electricity transmission and distribution system to maintain a reliable and secure electricity infrastructure that can meet future demand growth...” as well as to achieve several characteristic aspects of the Smart Grid. These aspects include smart metering, the use of digital controls to improve the efficiency, reliability, and security of the grid, deployment of smart technologies, and other key developments that would enhance the U.S. electric grid.

=== Section 1302: Smart grid system report ===
According to Title XIII Section 1302, reports are to be made to Congress one year after enactment and every two years subsequently to give “the status of smart grid deployments nationwide as well as any regulatory or government barriers to continued deployment”. The Smart Grid Task Force established in section 1303 will assist with this, and provide the current status and prospects of the smart grid including “information on technology penetration, communications network capabilities, costs, and obstacles”. This task force can make recommendations for State and Federal policies or actions to ease in the transition to a smart grid.

=== Section 1303. Smart grid advisory committee and smart grid task force ===
Title XIII Sec. 1303(a-b) provides for the creation of a Smart Grid Task Force and Advisory Committee. The purpose of the Smart Grid task force is to undertake research and development about the smart grid, developing relevant standards and protocols, defining the relationship between smart grid technologies and practices and current electric utility regulation, as well as researching the development of smart grid infrastructure. The task force is intended to collaborate with the Smart Grid Advisory Committee, whose purpose is to advise policymakers on the development of smart grid technologies and the progress of the country in adopting and transitioning to these technologies. Section 1302 of Title XIII calls for a biyearly Smart Grid system report to be generated by the Secretary of Energy and the Smart Grid Task Force with contributions from the Smart Grid Advisory Committee to brief Congress on the status of smart grid deployments throughout the country as well as “any regulatory or government barriers to continued deployment”. The report is to address the current status and outlook of the development and implementation of the smart grid.

=== Section 1304. Smart grid technology research, development and demonstration ===
Sec. 1304(a) also calls for the implementation of a program to develop power grid digital information technology, such as developing sophisticated techniques for determining peak load reductions and energy-efficiency savings from smart metering and other smart grid components. Other responsibilities of this program include creating algorithms to use in electric transmission system software applications and to investigate potential access by electric utilities to the electricity stored in alternative vehicles to meet peak demand loads. A smart grid regional demonstration initiative was also established by EISA Title XIII Sec. 1304(b) that is composed of demonstration projects aimed towards advanced technologies in the power grid. The goals of the ‘Initiative’ include demonstrating the potential benefits of investing in advanced grids and facilitating in the transition from the current grid system to the smart grid. These and other goals are to be carried out in the form of demonstrations in different electricity control areas.

=== Section 1305. Smart grid interoperability framework ===
A Smart Grid Interoperability Framework is mandated by Section 1305(a-e) of Title XIII whose purpose is to develop protocols and standards for the management of information so that smart grid devices and systems can interoperate within the existing electrical grid. The overarching goal of this framework is to “align policy, business, and technology approaches in a manner that would enable all electric resources, including demand-side resources, to contribute to an efficient, reliable electricity network”.

=== Section 1306. Federal matching fund for smart grid investment costs ===
Sec. 1306(a) provides for a federal matching fund for smart grid investment costs in which 20% of qualifying smart grid investments will be reimbursed by the grant program. Qualifying investments that are provided for in section 1306(b) include certain household appliances, specialized electricity-using equipment like motors and drivers, metering devices and transmission and distribution equipment. The computer software that enables devices to engage in Smart Grid functions is also considered qualifying investments, as well as hybrid vehicles.

=== Section 1307. State consideration for smart grid ===
Section 1307 provides that electric utilities in individual states should consider and report to the state on investing in a qualified smart grid system based on a variety of economic, social, and technological factors. These factors listed in Sec. 1307(a)(16)(A)include the total costs and cost-effectiveness, "improved reliability, security, system performance, and societal benefit". State electric utilities are also permitted in Sec. 1307(a)(16)(B)to recover any capital, operating expenditure, or other costs of the electric utility relating to the deployment of the smart grid, from ratepayers. Electricity purchasers are likewise entitled to direct access to information from their electricity provider on the smart grid such as prices, usage, intervals and projections, and sources from which their power was generated. Purchasers are also allowed to access their power information through the internet or other means as granted through Sec. 1307(a)(17)(B).

=== Section 1308. Study of the effect of private wire laws on development ===
Studies on both the effect of private wire laws on the development of combined heat and power facilities as well as on security attributes of smart grid systems are also provided for in this piece of the legislation. A study of the laws and regulations affecting the siting of privately owned electric distribution wires on and across public rights-of-way is to be conducted according to Sec. 1308(a)(1). The required evaluation must address the purposes of the laws and the “effect the laws have on the development of combined heat and power facilities”. The study must also determine whether a change in the laws would have any major impacts on electric utilities and the customers of the utilities. Lastly, it must assess whether privately owned electric distribution wires would result in “duplicative facilities” and whether these are necessary or desirable.

=== Section 1309. DoE study of security attributes of smart grid systems ===
This section requires that a report be submitted to Congress that “provides a quantitative assessment and determination of the existing and potential impacts of the deployment of Smart Grid systems on improving the security of the Nation’s electricity infrastructure and operating capability” according to Sec. 1309(a). The report should address how Smart Grid improves or disrupts the security of the nation's electrical grid, reliability, stability during emergencies, and potential risks of the system.

== Development barriers ==
There are many technological barriers to achieving a smart grid. One of the largest is the deployment of advanced metering infrastructure (AMI) technology. These devices receive market data and adjust household consumption accordingly. The ability to measure bidirectional flow of power and offer dynamic pricing by AMI technology is essential to the successfulness of the deployment of other technologies such as distributed generation, demand response measures, or automated distribution schemes. Additionally, the aging distribution system raises questions as to whether it will be able to reliably handle smart technology and distributed distribution. Investments will need to be made in distribution infrastructure and management practices to handle the increase in smart technology deployment. Consumer products such as washers, driers, and water heaters need to be designed or retrofitted to handle dynamic communication of market signals from AMI devices. Finally, the widespread sharing of data and control of personal devices presents large legal, privacy, and security risks that must be addressed.

== Future regulation and policy ==
Since the federal government has stated the goal of promoting smart grid-technology, future legislation and incentives will address technical implementation and budgetary barriers. The Department of Energy (DoE), Federal Energy Regulatory Commission (FERC), and National Institute of Standards and Technology (NIST) are the primary government agencies developing smart grid policy. The DoE is working towards the development of smart grids through investment grants, demonstration pilot programs, and research and development. In addition, they are responsible for monitoring the progress of smart grid deployment and must submit a biannual report to Congress. The Federal Energy Regulatory Commission (FERC) has the authority to regulate the wholesale distribution of electricity. FERC is collaborating with the National Institute of Standards and Technology to develop the hundreds of standards necessary to regulate smart grid technology. The development of regulations and standards for the wide range of technology involved is essential to remove legal barriers and facilitate the development of technological solutions.

=== Department of Energy ===
In 2009, the DoE elected 9 pilot projects to demonstrate different smart grid technologies under the Distributed Systems Integration Program. Each program is expected to reduce peak loads by 15%. Projects are located in Hawaii, California, Nevada, Utah, Colorado, Illinois, West Virginia, and New York. The technologies being tested for each project vary widely based on the resources available in the region. For example, in Las Vegas, Nevada where residential energy demand is high due to the desert climate, the “Hybrid” Home project by the University of Nevada, Las Vegas aims to reduce residential peak load demand by developing photovoltaics and energy storage with advanced meters for automated demand response. In Illinois on the other hand, the Never-Failing Perfect Power Prototype by the Illinois Institute of Technology aims to integrate advanced meters, power controller systems, and demand response controllers to create a more robust distribution grid that reduces peak loads and reduces the risk of blackouts. These pilot projects are important research opportunities both to develop the new technology and to point out policy and regulation concerns that must be addressed.

In addition to funding research and pilot programs, the DoE is tasked with monitoring the development of smart grids and reporting to Congress every two years. In their first report in 2009, the DoE set forth 20 metrics by which current smart grids deployment was rated and can be measured. The report found that policy and regulatory progress was at a low level of maturity but was increasing at a moderate trend. The report also stated that policy and regulation should be emphasized to enable the development of new smart grid products, services, and markets.

=== Federal Energy Regulatory Commission ===
FERC's primary responsibilities and jurisdiction require it to establish rates and terms and conditions for wholesale interstate transmission and sale of electricity. Under EISA it is given the authority to develop standards but has not been mandated to or given the authority to make standards mandatory. Their efforts, therefore, have been to collect information and concerns from stakeholders such as the National Association of Regulatory Utility Commissioners and assist the NIST in developing standards relevant to FERC's jurisdiction. FERC identified two major policy issues to address, system security and inter-system communication. In addition, it identified wide-area situational awareness, demand response, electric storage, electric vehicles, advanced metering, and distribution system automation as six areas of functionality that must be given priority.

=== National Institute of Standards and Technology ===
In January 2010, the NIST published the Framework and Roadmap for Smart Grid Interoperability Standards, Release 1.0. The publication identified 75 standards ranging from telecommunications, internet, and power industry topics that are applicable to smart grids. In addition, it identified 16 priority areas that are essential to addressing policy and regulatory gaps. The NIST also formed the Smart Grid Interoperability Panel of 22 stakeholders to continually provide input on the regulations being developed. This panel will play a major role in the second release of the standards, on which work began in October 2010. In a future phase fully consistent with NIST's core mission and its charge under 2007 EISA, the integrated testbed will also serve as an on-going permanent resource to the electric power industrial sector for smart grid standards validation and development of advanced smart grid measurements suggested by the evolution of the grid. The testbed will implement network communication by way of a home microgrid protocol and the Building Automation and Controls Network (BACnet) data protocol. The testbed will involve approximately 15 NIST personnel already working on related topics with the Smart Grid and Cyber-Physical Systems Program Office, and involved in Smart Grid Interoperability Panel 2.0, Inc. activities

=== States ===
At the state level, several states have created legislation to facilitate the development of smart grids. California Senate Bill 17 requires the California Public Utility Commission (California PUC) to create a smart grid deployment plan by July 1, 2001, and electrical corporations must submit a smart grid deployment plan to the California PUC by June 1, 2011. The bill required that standards be adopted for California that complied with standards from NIST, the Gridwise Architecture Council, the International Electrical and Electronics Engineers, the North America Electric Reliability Cooperation, and FERC. If utilities fail to meet the standards or present a plan to meet them by the June 1 deadline, they will be vulnerable to millions of dollars in penalties. In Illinois, utilities must reduce peak load by 0.1% every year for 10 years according to the Illinois Power Agency Act, Senate Bill 1592. While this does not specifically require the development of smart grids, it has resulted in several state utilities investing in smart grids including the deployment of several hundred thousand smart meters. A similar policy has been enacted in Maryland. According to the EmPOWER Maryland Energy Efficiency Act of 2008, Senate Bill 205, utilities must reduce peak demand by 15% by 2015. The law tasks the Maryland Public Service Commission with determining the effectiveness of smart grid technology and gives it the authority to mandate the deployment of smart grid technology by utilities. In Colorado, the city of Boulder is acting as a case study on smart grid technology. A major concern of the state legislature is the security of information being transmitted over the grid, the findings in Boulder will play a significant role in the development of policy for the rest of the state.

== See also ==
- National Institute of Standards and Technology
