= Smart grid =

Type of electrical grid

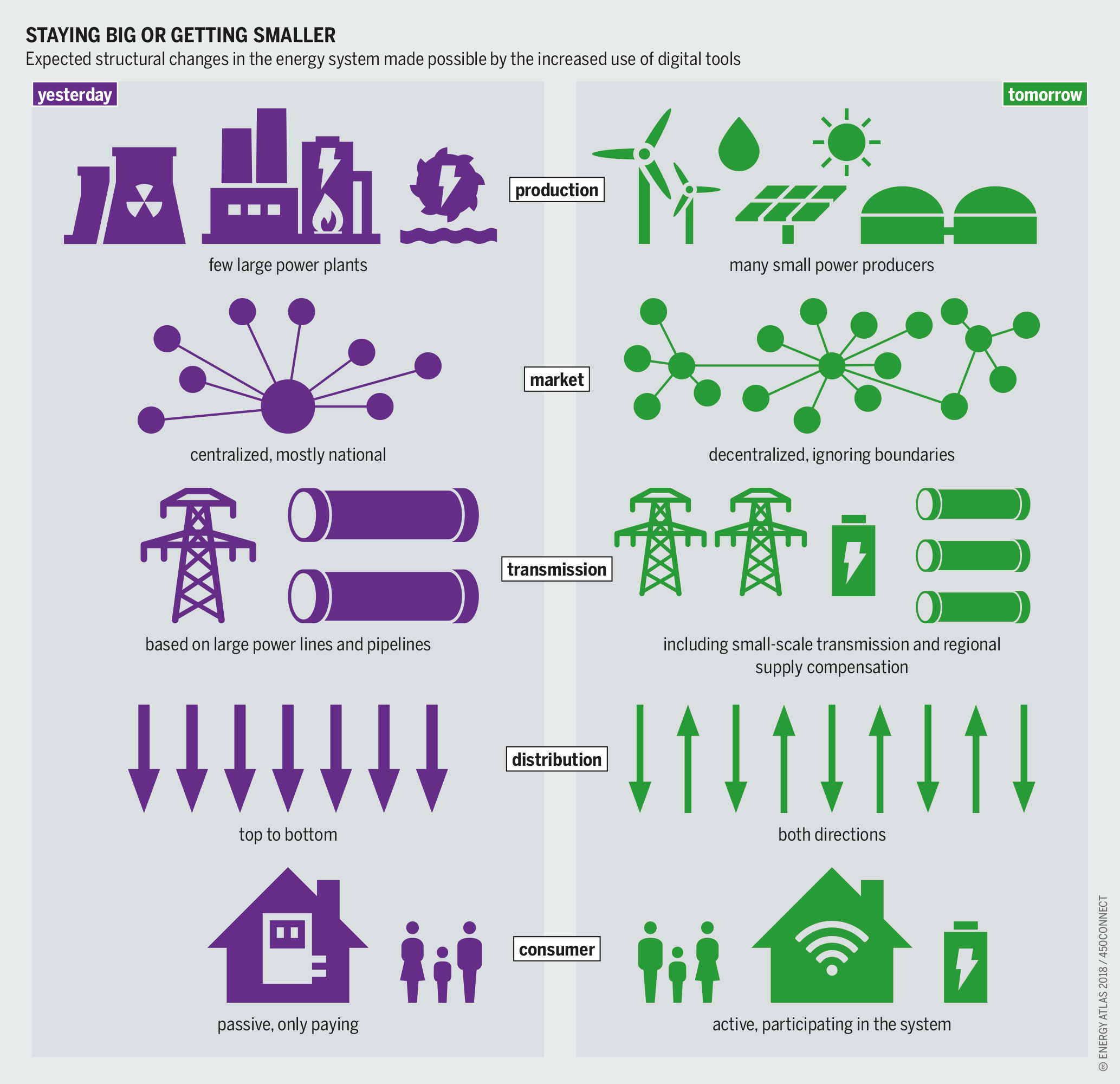
Characteristics of a traditional centralized electrical system (left) vis-à-vis those of a smart grid (right)

The smart grid is an enhancement of the 20th century electrical grid, using two-way communications and distributed so-called intelligent devices. Two-way flows of electricity and information could improve the delivery network. Research is mainly focused on three systems of a smart grid: the infrastructure system, the management system, and the protection system. Electronic power conditioning and control of the production and distribution of electricity are important aspects of the smart grid.

The smart grid represents the full suite of current and proposed responses to the challenges of electricity supply. Numerous contributions to the overall improvement of energy infrastructure efficiency are anticipated from the deployment of smart grid technology, in particular including demand-side management. The improved flexibility of the smart grid permits greater penetration of highly variable renewable energy sources, such as solar power and wind power, even without the addition of energy storage. Smart grids could also monitor/control residential devices that are noncritical during periods of peak power consumption, and return their function during nonpeak hours.

A smart grid includes a variety of operation and energy measures:

- Advanced metering infrastructure (of which smart meters are a generic name for any utility side device even if it is more capable e.g., a fiber optic router)
- Smart distribution boards and circuit breakers integrated with home control and demand response (behind the meter from a utility perspective)
  - Load control switches and smart appliances, often financed by efficiency gains on municipal programs (e.g., PACE financing)
- Renewable energy resources, including the capacity to charge parked electric vehicle (EV) batteries or larger arrays of batteries recycled from these, or other energy storage.
- Energy efficient resources
- Electric surplus distribution by power lines and auto-smart switch
- Sufficient utility grade fiber broadband to connect and monitor the above, with wireless as a backup. Sufficient spare "dark" capacity to ensure failover, often leased for revenue.

Concerns with smart grid technology mostly focus on smart meters, items enabled by them, and general security issues. Roll-out of smart grid technology also implies a fundamental re-engineering of the electricity services industry, although typical usage of the term is focused on the technical infrastructure.

Smart grid policy is organized in Europe as Smart Grid European Technology Platform. Policy in the United States is described in Title 42 of the United States Code.

Smart grids are not to be confused with sector coupled smart energy systems, as smart grids primarily refers to the power sector, while smart energy systems use an integrated holistic focus which also includes other sectors of the energy system with the intent to create synergies between them.

== Background ==
=== Historical development of the electricity grid ===
The first alternating current power grid system was installed in 1886 in Great Barrington, Massachusetts. At that time, the grid was a centralized unidirectional system of electric power transmission, electricity distribution, and demand-driven control.

During the 20th century, local grids grew over time and were eventually interconnected for economic and reliability reasons. By the 1960s, the electric grids of developed countries had become very large, mature, and highly interconnected, with thousands of 'central' generation power stations delivering power to major load centers via high-capacity power lines, which were then branched and divided to provide power to smaller industrial and domestic users over the entire supply area. The topology of the 1960s grid was a result of the strong economies of scale—large coal-, gas-, and oil-fired power stations in the 1 GW (1000 MW) to 3 GW scale were still found to be cost-effective, due to efficiency-boosting features that can be cost-effective only when the stations become very large.

Power stations were located strategically to be close to fossil fuel reserves (either the mines or wells themselves, or close to rail, road, or port supply lines). Siting of hydroelectric dams in mountain areas also strongly influenced the structure of the emerging grid. Nuclear power plants were sited for the availability of cooling water. Finally, fossil fuel-fired power stations were initially very polluting and therefore sited as far as economically possible from population centers once electricity distribution networks permitted it. By the late 1960s, the electricity grid reached the majority of the population of developed countries, with only outlying regional areas remaining 'off-grid'.

Metering of electricity consumption was necessary on a per-user basis to allow appropriate billing according to the (highly variable) level of consumption of different users. Due to limited data collection and processing capability during the grid's period of growth, fixed-tariff arrangements were commonly put in place, as well as dual-tariff arrangements where night-time power was charged at a lower rate than daytime power. The motivation for dual-tariff arrangements was the lower night-time demand. Dual tariffs made possible the use of low-cost night-time electrical power in applications, such as maintaining 'heat banks' which served to 'smooth out' the daily demand, and reduce the number of turbines that needed to be turned off overnight, thereby improving the utilization and profitability of generation and transmission facilities. The metering capabilities of the 1960s grid meant technological limitations on the degree to which price signals could be propagated through the system.

From the 1970s to the 1990s, growing demand led to increasing numbers of power stations. In some areas, the supply of electricity, especially at peak times, could not keep up with demand, resulting in poor power quality including blackouts, power cuts, and brownouts. Increasingly, electricity was depended on for industry, heating, communication, lighting, and entertainment, and consumers demanded ever-higher levels of reliability.

Toward the end of the 20th century, electricity demand patterns were established: domestic heating and air-conditioning led to daily peaks in demand that were met by an array of 'peaking power generators' that would only be turned on for short periods each day. The relatively low utilization of these peaking generators (commonly, gas turbines were used due to their relatively lower capital cost and faster start-up times), together with the necessary redundancy in the electricity grid, resulting in high costs to the electricity companies, which were passed on in the form of increased tariffs.

In the 21st century, some developing countries like China, India, and Brazil were seen as pioneers of smart grid deployment.

=== Modernization opportunities ===
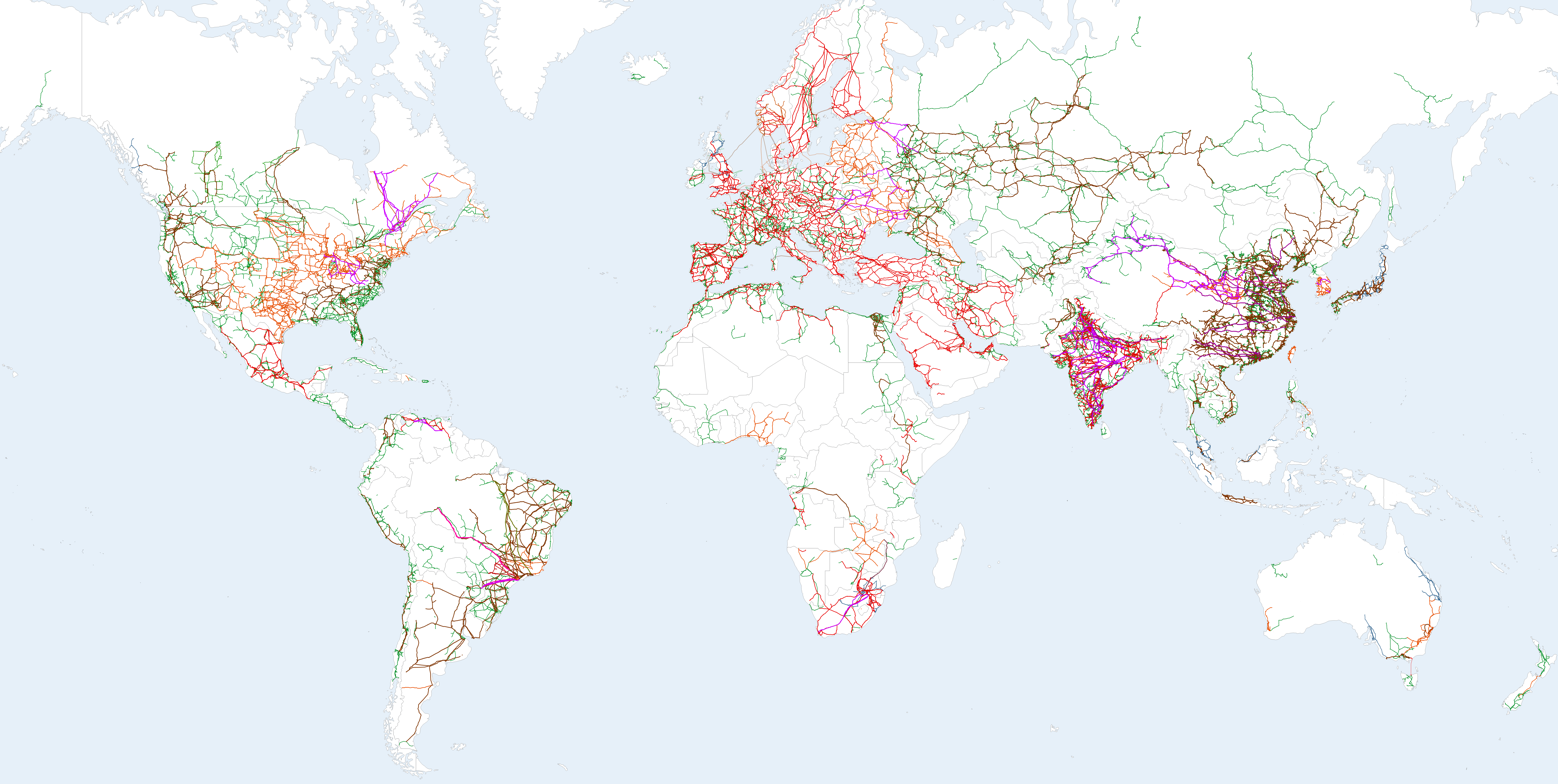
World map of high voltage transmission lines with more than 220 kV in 2023

Since the early 21st century, opportunities to take advantage of improvements in electronic communication technology to resolve the limitations and costs of the electrical grid have become apparent. Technological limitations on metering no longer force peak power prices to be averaged out and passed on to all consumers equally. In parallel, growing concerns over environmental damage from fossil-fired power stations have led to a desire to use large amounts of renewable energy. Dominant forms such as wind power and solar power are highly variable, and so the need for more sophisticated control systems became apparent, to facilitate the connection of sources to the otherwise highly controllable grid. Power from photovoltaic cells (and to lesser extent wind turbines) has also, significantly, called into question the imperative for large, centralised power stations. The rapidly falling costs point to a major change from the centralised grid topology to one that is highly distributed, with power being both generated and consumed right at the limits of the grid. Finally, growing concern over terrorist attacks in some countries has led to calls for a more robust energy grid that is less dependent on centralised power stations that were perceived to be potential attack targets.

=== Definition of "smart grid" ===
Video about smart grids

==== United States ====
The first official definition of Smart Grid was provided by the Energy Independence and Security Act of 2007 (EISA-2007), which was approved by the U.S. Congress in January 2007, and signed into law by President George W. Bush in December 2007. Title XIII of this bill provides a description, with 10 characteristics, that can be considered a definition for Smart Grid, as follows:

"It is the policy of the United States to support the modernization of the Nation's electricity transmission and distribution system to maintain a reliable and secure electricity infrastructure that can meet future demand growth and to achieve each of the following, which together characterize a Smart Grid: (1) Increased use of digital information and controls technology to improve reliability, security, and efficiency of the electric grid. (2) Dynamic optimization of grid operations and resources, with full cyber-security. (3) Deployment and integration of distributed resources and generation, including renewable resources. (4) Development and incorporation of demand response, demand-side resources, and energy-efficiency resources. (5) Deployment of 'smart' technologies (real-time, automated, interactive technologies that optimize the physical operation of appliances and consumer devices) for metering, communications concerning grid operations and status, and distribution automation. (6) Integration of 'smart' appliances and consumer devices. (7) Deployment and integration of advanced electricity storage and peak-shaving technologies, including plug-in electric and hybrid electric vehicles, and thermal storage air conditioning. (8) Provision to consumers of timely information and control options. (9) Development of standards for communication and interoperability of appliances and equipment connected to the electric grid, including the infrastructure serving the grid. (10) Identification and lowering of unreasonable or unnecessary barriers to adoption of smart grid technologies, practices, and services."

==== European Union ====
The European Union Commission Task Force for Smart Grids also provides smart grid definition as:

"A Smart Grid is an electricity network that can cost efficiently integrate the behaviour and actions of all users connected to it—generators, consumers, and those that do both—to ensure economically efficient, sustainable power system with low losses and high levels of quality and security of supply and safety. A smart grid employs innovative products and services together with intelligent monitoring, control, communication, and self-healing technologies in order to:

1. Better facilitate the connection and operation of generators of all sizes and technologies.
2. Allow consumers to play a part in optimising the operation of the system.
3. Provide consumers with greater information and options for how they use their supply.
4. Significantly reduce the environmental impact of the whole electricity supply system.
5. Maintain or even improve the existing high levels of system reliability, quality and security of supply.
6. Maintain and improve the existing services efficiently."

That definition was used in the European Commission Communication (2011) 202.

A common element to most definitions is the application of digital processing and communications to the power grid, making data flow and information management central to the smart grid. Various capabilities result from the deeply integrated use of digital technology with power grids. Integration of the new grid information is one of the key issues in the design of smart grids. Electric utilities now find themselves making three classes of transformations: improvement of infrastructure, called the strong grid in China; addition of the digital layer, which is the essence of the smart grid; and business process transformation, necessary to capitalize on the investments in smart technology. Much of the work that has been going on in electric grid modernization, especially substation and distribution automation, is now included in the general concept of the smart grid.

=== Early technological innovations ===
Smart grid technologies emerged from earlier attempts at using electronic control, metering, and monitoring. In the 1980s, automatic meter reading was used for monitoring loads from large customers and evolved into the Advanced Metering Infrastructure of the 1990s, whose meters could store how electricity was used at different times of the day. Smart meters add continuous communications so that monitoring can be done in real-time, and can be used as a gateway to demand response-aware devices and "smart sockets" in the home. Early forms of such demand side management technologies were dynamic demand aware devices that passively sensed the load on the grid by monitoring changes in the power supply frequency. Devices such as industrial and domestic air conditioners, refrigerators, and heaters adjusted their duty cycle to avoid activation during times the grid was suffering a peak condition. Beginning in 2000, Italy's Telegestore Project was the first to network large numbers (27M) of homes using smart meters connected via low bandwidth power line communication. Some experiments used the term broadband over power lines (BPL), while others used wireless technologies such as mesh networking promoted for more reliable connections to disparate devices in the home as well as supporting metering of other utilities such as gas and water.

Monitoring and synchronization of wide-area networks were revolutionized in the early 1990s when the Bonneville Power Administration expanded its smart grid research with prototype sensors that are capable of very rapid analysis of anomalies in electricity quality over very large geographic areas. The culmination of this work was the first operational Wide Area Measurement System (WAMS) in 2000. Other countries are rapidly integrating this technology—China started having a comprehensive national WAMS when the past 5-year economic plan was completed in 2012.

The earliest deployments of smart grids include the Italian system Telegestore (2005), the mesh network of Austin, Texas (since 2003), and the smart grid in Boulder, Colorado (2008). See § Deployments and attempted deployments below.

== Features ==
A smart grid would allow the power industry to observe and control parts of the system at higher resolution in time and space. One of the purposes of the smart grid is real time information exchange to make operation as efficient as possible. It would allow management of the grid on all time scales from high-frequency switching devices on a microsecond scale, to wind and solar output variations on a minute scale, to the future effects of the carbon emissions generated by power production on a decade scale.

The smart grid represents the full suite of current and proposed responses to the challenges of electricity supply. Because of the diverse range of factors, there are numerous competing taxonomies and no agreement on a universal definition. Nevertheless, one possible categorization is given here.

=== Reliability ===
The smart grid makes use of technologies such as state estimation, that improve fault detection and allow self-healing of the network without the intervention of technicians. This will ensure a more reliable supply of electricity and reduce vulnerability to natural disasters or attacks.

Although multiple routes are touted as a feature of the smart grid, the old grid also featured multiple routes. Initial power lines in the grid were built using a radial model, later connectivity was guaranteed via multiple routes, referred to as a network structure. However, this created a new problem: if the current flow or related effects across the network exceed the limits of any particular network element, it could fail, and the current would be shunted to other network elements, which eventually may fail also, causing a domino effect. See power outage. A technique to prevent this is load shedding by rolling blackout or voltage reduction (brownout).

=== Flexibility in network topology ===
Next-generation transmission and distribution infrastructure will be better able to handle possible bidirectional energy flows, allowing for distributed generation such as from photovoltaic panels on building roofs, but also charging to/from the batteries of electric cars, wind turbines, pumped hydroelectric power, the use of fuel cells, and other sources.

Classic grids were designed for a one-way flow of electricity, but if a local sub-network generates more power than it is consuming, the reverse flow can raise safety and reliability issues. A smart grid aims to manage these situations.

=== Efficiency ===
Numerous contributions to the overall improvement of the efficiency of energy infrastructure are anticipated from the deployment of smart grid technology, in particular including demand-side management, for example turning off air conditioners during short-term spikes in electricity price, reducing the voltage when possible on distribution lines through Voltage/VAR Optimization (VVO), eliminating truck-rolls for meter reading, and reducing truck-rolls by improved outage management using data from Advanced Metering Infrastructure systems. The overall effect is less redundancy in transmission and distribution lines, and greater utilization of generators, leading to lower power prices.

==== Load adjustment/Load balancing ====
The total load connected to the power grid can vary significantly over time. Although the total load is the sum of many individual choices of the clients, the overall load is not necessarily stable or slow varying. For example, if a popular television program starts, millions of televisions will start to draw current instantly. Traditionally, to respond to a rapid increase in power consumption, faster than the start-up time of a large generator, some spare generators are put on a dissipative standby mode. A smart grid may warn all individual television sets, or another larger customer, to reduce the load temporarily (to allow time to start up a larger generator) or continuously (in the case of limited resources). Using mathematical prediction algorithms it is possible to predict how many standby generators need to be used, to reach a certain failure rate. In the traditional grid, the failure rate can only be reduced at the cost of more standby generators. In a smart grid, the load reduction by even a small portion of the clients may eliminate the problem.

==== Peak curtailment/leveling and time of use pricing ====
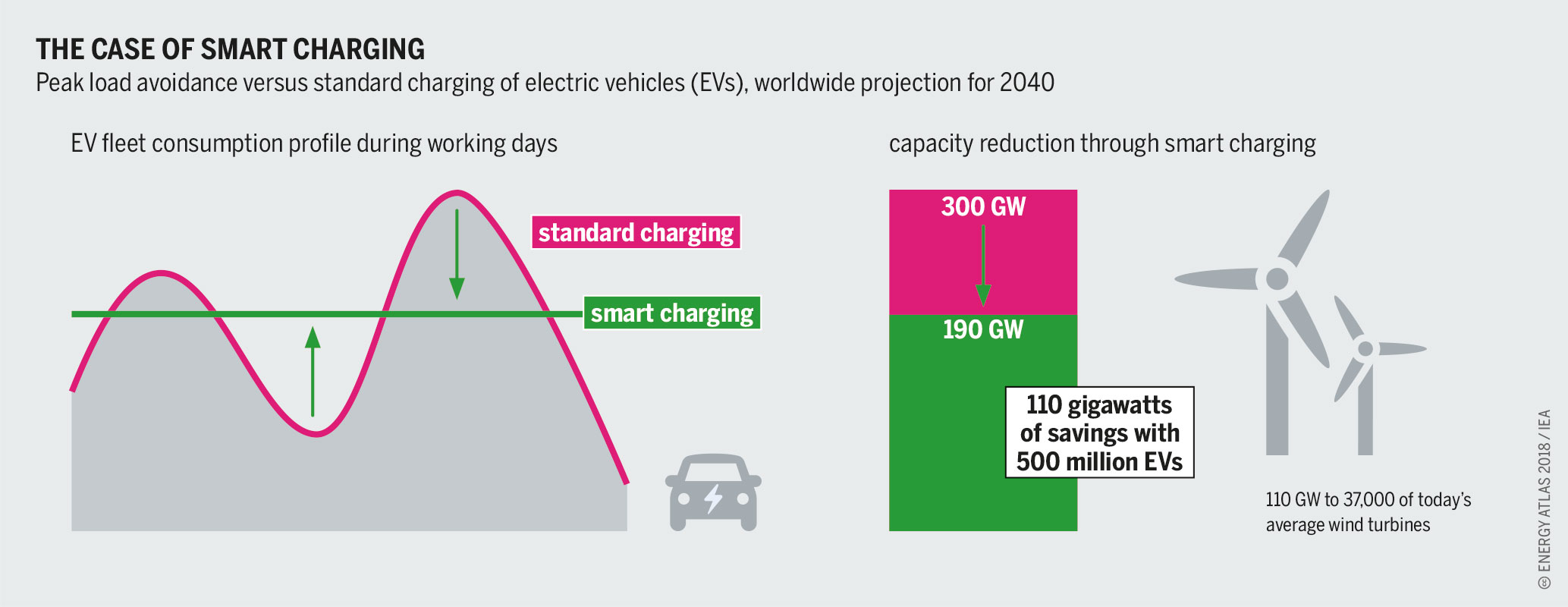
Peak load avoidance by smart charging of electric vehicles

To reduce demand during the high-cost peak usage periods, communications and metering technologies inform smart devices in the home and business when energy demand is high and track how much electricity is used and when it is used. It also gives utility companies the ability to reduce consumption by communicating to devices directly in order to prevent system overloads. Examples would be a utility reducing the usage of a group of electric vehicle charging stations or shifting temperature set points of air conditioners in a city. To motivate them to cut back use and perform what is called peak curtailment or peak leveling, prices of electricity are increased during high demand periods and decreased during low demand periods. It is thought that consumers and businesses will tend to consume less during high-demand periods if it is possible for consumers and consumer devices to be aware of the high price premium for using electricity at peak periods. This could mean making trade-offs such as cycling on/off air conditioners or running dishwashers at 9 p.m. instead of 5 p.m. When businesses and consumers see a direct economic benefit of using energy at off-peak times, the theory is that they will include the energy cost of operation into their consumer device and building construction decisions and hence become more energy efficient.

=== Sustainability ===
The improved flexibility of the smart grid permits greater penetration of highly variable renewable energy sources such as solar power and wind power, even without the addition of energy storage. Current network infrastructure is not built to allow for many distributed feed-in points, and typically even if some feed-in is allowed at the local (distribution) level, the transmission-level infrastructure cannot accommodate it. Rapid fluctuations in distributed generation, such as due to cloudy or gusty weather, present significant challenges to power engineers who need to ensure stable power levels through varying the output of the more controllable generators such as gas turbines and hydroelectric generators. Smart grid technology is a necessary condition for very large amounts of renewable electricity on the grid for this reason. There is also support for vehicle-to-grid.

=== Market-enabling ===
The smart grid allows for systematic communication between suppliers (their energy price) and consumers (their willingness-to-pay), and permits both the suppliers and the consumers to be more flexible and sophisticated in their operational strategies. Only the critical loads will need to pay the peak energy prices, and consumers will be able to be more strategic in when they use energy. Generators with greater flexibility will be able to sell energy strategically for maximum profit, whereas inflexible generators such as base-load steam turbines and wind turbines will receive a varying tariff based on the level of demand and the status of the other generators currently operating. The overall effect is a signal that awards energy efficiency, and energy consumption that is sensitive to the time-varying limitations of the supply. At the domestic level, appliances with a degree of energy storage or thermal mass (such as refrigerators, heat banks, and heat pumps) will be well placed to 'play' the market and seek to minimise energy cost by adapting demand to the lower-cost energy support periods. This is an extension of the dual-tariff energy pricing mentioned above.

==== Demand response support ====
Demand response support allows generators and loads to interact in an automated fashion in real-time, coordinating demand to flatten spikes. Eliminating the fraction of demand that occurs in these spikes eliminates the cost of adding reserve generators, cuts wear and tear and extends the life of equipment, and allows users to cut their energy bills by telling low priority devices to use energy only when it is cheapest.

Currently, power grid systems have varying degrees of communication within control systems for their high-value assets, such as in generating plants, transmission lines, substations, and major energy users. In general, information flows one way, from the users and the loads they control back to the utilities. The utilities attempt to meet the demand and succeed or fail to varying degrees (brownouts, rolling blackout, uncontrolled blackout). The total amount of power demanded by the users can have a very wide probability distribution which requires spare generating plants in standby mode to respond to the rapidly changing power usage. This one-way flow of information is expensive; the last 10% of generating capacity may be required as little as 1% of the time, and brownouts and outages can be costly to consumers.

Demand response can be provided by commercial, residential loads, and industrial loads. For example, Alcoa's Warrick Operation is participating in MISO as a qualified Demand Response Resource, and the Trimet Aluminium uses its smelter as a short-term mega-battery.

Latency of the data flow is a major concern, with some early smart meter architectures allowing actually as long as 24 hours delay in receiving the data, preventing any possible reaction by either supplying or demanding devices.

== Technology ==
The bulk of smart grid technologies are already used in other applications such as manufacturing and telecommunications and are being adapted for use in grid operations.

- Integrated communications: Areas for improvement include: substation automation, demand response, distribution automation, supervisory control, and data acquisition (SCADA), energy management systems, wireless mesh networks and other technologies, power-line carrier communications, and fiber-optics. Integrated communications will allow for real-time control, information, and data exchange to optimize system reliability, asset utilization, and security.
- Sensing and measurement: core duties are evaluating congestion and grid stability, monitoring equipment health, energy theft prevention, and control strategies support. Technologies include advanced microprocessor meters (smart meter) and meter reading equipment, wide-area monitoring systems, (typically based on online readings by Distributed temperature sensing combined with RTTR (Real Time Thermal Rating) systems), electromagnetic signature measurement/analysis, time-of-use, and real-time pricing tools, advanced switches and cables, backscatter radio technology, and Digital protective relays.
- Smart meters.
- Phasor measurement units. Many in the power systems engineering community believe that the Northeast blackout of 2003 could have been contained to a much smaller area if a wide area phasor measurement network had been in place.
- Distributed power flow control: power flow control devices clamp onto existing transmission lines to control the flow of power within. Transmission lines enabled with such devices support greater use of renewable energy by providing more consistent, real-time control over how that energy is routed within the grid. This technology enables the grid to more effectively store intermittent energy from renewables for later use.
- Smart power generation using advanced components: smart power generation is a concept of matching electricity generation with demand using multiple identical generators which can start, stop and operate efficiently at chosen load, independently of the others, making them suitable for baseload and peaking power generation. Matching supply and demand, called load balancing, is essential for a stable and reliable supply of electricity. Short-term deviations in the balance lead to frequency variations and a prolonged mismatch results in blackouts. Operators of power transmission systems are charged with the balancing task, matching the power output of all the generators to the load of their electrical grid. The load balancing task has become much more challenging as increasingly intermittent and variable generators such as wind turbines and solar cells are added to the grid, forcing other producers to adapt their output much more frequently than has been required in the past. The first two dynamic grid stability power plants utilizing the concept have been ordered by Elering and will be built by Wärtsilä in Kiisa, Estonia (Kiisa Power Plant). Their purpose is to "provide dynamic generation capacity to meet sudden and unexpected drops in the electricity supply". They are scheduled to be ready during 2013 and 2014, and their total output will be 250 MW.
- Power system automation enables rapid diagnosis of and precise solutions to specific grid disruptions or outages. These technologies rely on and contribute to each of the other four key areas. Three technology categories for advanced control methods are distributed intelligent agents (control systems), analytical tools (software algorithms and high-speed computers), and operational applications (SCADA, substation automation, demand response, etc.). Using artificial intelligence programming techniques, the Fujian power grid in China created a wide area protection system that is rapidly able to accurately calculate a control strategy and execute it. The Voltage Stability Monitoring & Control (VSMC) software uses a sensitivity-based successive linear programming method to reliably determine the optimal control solution.

== Research ==
=== Major programs ===
IntelliGrid architecture, created by the Electric Power Research Institute (EPRI), provides methodology, tools, and recommendations for standards and technologies for utility use in planning, specifying, and procuring IT-based systems, such as advanced metering, distribution automation, and demand response. The architecture also provides a living laboratory for assessing devices, systems, and technology. Several utilities have applied IntelliGrid architecture, including Southern California Edison, Long Island Power Authority, Salt River Project, and TXU Electric Delivery. The IntelliGrid Consortium is a public/private partnership that integrates and optimizes global research efforts, funds technology R&D, works to integrate technologies, and disseminates technical information.

Grid 2030 is a joint vision statement for the U.S. electrical system developed by the electric utility industry, equipment manufacturers, information technology (IT) providers, federal and state government agencies, interest groups, universities, and national laboratories. It covers generation, transmission, distribution, storage, and end-use. The National Electric Delivery Technologies Roadmap is the implementation document for the Grid 2030 vision. The Roadmap outlines the key issues and challenges for modernizing the grid and suggests paths that government and industry can take to build America's future electric delivery system.

Modern Grid Initiative (MGI) is a collaborative effort between the U.S. Department of Energy (DOE), the National Energy Technology Laboratory (NETL), utilities, consumers, researchers, and other grid stakeholders to modernize and integrate the U.S. electrical grid. DOE's Office of Electricity Delivery and Energy Reliability (OE) sponsors the initiative, which builds upon Grid 2030 and the National Electricity Delivery Technologies Roadmap and is aligned with other programs such as GridWise and GridWorks.

GridWise is a DOE OE program focused on developing IT to modernize the U.S. electrical grid. Working with the GridWise Alliance, the program invests in communications architecture and standards; simulation and analysis tools; smart technologies; test beds and demonstration projects; and new regulatory, institutional, and market frameworks. The GridWise Alliance is a consortium of public and private electricity sector stakeholders, providing a forum for idea exchanges, cooperative efforts, and meetings with policy makers at federal and state levels.

GridWise Architecture Council (GWAC) was formed by the U.S. DOE to promote and enable interoperability among the many entities that interact with the nation's electric power system. The GWAC members are a balanced and respected team representing the many constituencies of the electricity supply chain and users. The GWAC provides industry guidance and tools to articulate the goal of interoperability across the electric system, identify the concepts and architectures needed to make interoperability possible, and develop actionable steps to facilitate the inter operation of the systems, devices, and institutions that encompass the nation's electric system. The GridWise Architecture Council Interoperability Context Setting Framework, V 1.1 defines necessary guidelines and principles.

GridWorks is a DOE OE program focused on improving the reliability of the electric system through modernizing key grid components, such as cables and conductors, substations and protective systems, and power electronics. The program's focus includes coordinating efforts on high temperature superconducting systems, transmission reliability technologies, electric distribution technologies, energy storage devices, and GridWise systems.

Pacific Northwest Smart Grid Demonstration Project is a demonstration across five Pacific Northwest states: Idaho, Montana, Oregon, Washington, and Wyoming. It involves about 60,000 metered customers, and contains many key functions of the future smart grid.

Solar Cities, in Australia, is a programme included in close collaboration with energy companies to trial smart meters, peak and off-peak pricing, remote switching and related efforts. It also provided some limited funding for grid upgrades.

Smart Grid Energy Research Center (SMERC), located at University of California, Los Angeles, dedicated its efforts to large-scale testing of its smart EV charging network technology. It created another platform for bidirectional flow of information between a utility and consumer end-devices. SMERC also developed a demand response (DR) test bed that comprises a Control Center, Demand Response Automation Server (DRAS), Home-Area-Network (HAN), Battery Energy Storage System (BESS), and photovoltaic (PV) panels. These technologies are installed within the Los Angeles Department of Water and Power and Southern California Edison territory as a network of EV chargers, battery energy storage systems, solar panels, DC fast charger, and Vehicle-to-Grid (V2G) units. These platforms, communications and control networks enables UCLA-led projects within the area to be tested in partnership with two local utilities, SCE and LADWP.

Smart Quart project, in Germany, develops three smart districts to develop, test, and showcase technology to operate smart grids. The project is a collaboration of E.ON, Viessmann, gridX, and hydrogenious together with the RWTH Aachen University. It was planned that by the end of 2024, all three districts would be supplied with locally generated energy and be largely independent of fossil energy sources.

Smart5Grid, in Portugal, aims to ensure that operators in the energy sector take advantage of the benefits associated with the use of 5G networks. With reliability and security, a solution is proposed to precisely address the specific requirements imposed by Smart Grids, such as high data transfer rates and real-time monitoring.

=== Smart grid modelling ===
Many different concepts have been used to model intelligent power grids. They are generally studied within the framework of complex systems. In a recent brainstorming session, the power grid was considered within the context of optimal control, ecology, human cognition, glassy dynamics, information theory, microphysics of clouds, and many others. Here is a selection of the types of analyses that have appeared in recent years.

Protection systems that verify and supervise themselves

Pelqim Spahiu and Ian R. Evans in their study introduced the concept of a substation based smart protection and hybrid Inspection Unit.

Kuramoto oscillators

The power grid has been mapped onto variations of the Kuramoto model, a well-studied framework for synchronization of nonlinear oscillators. The model describes how the electrical system keeps the power balance, to maintain phase synchronization (also known as phase locking). Strictly speaking, the model is most used for an ordinary electrical grid, to determine, for instance, the role of branch insertions or of parameters dispersion. Non-uniform oscillators also help to model different technologies, different types of power generators, patterns of consumption, and so on. The model has also been used to describe the synchronization patterns in the blinking of fireflies.

Smart Grid Communication Network

Network Simulators are used to simulate/emulate network communication effects. This typically involves setting up a lab with the smart grid devices, applications etc. with the virtual network being provided by the network simulator.

Neural networks

Neural networks have been considered for power grid management as well. Electric power systems can be classified in multiple different ways: non-linear, dynamic, discrete, or random. Artificial Neural Networks (ANNs) attempt to solve the most difficult of these problems, the non-linear problems.

Demand Forecasting

One application of ANNs is in demand forecasting. In order for grids to operate economically and reliably, demand forecasting is essential, because it is used to predict the amount of power that will be consumed by the load. This is dependent on weather conditions, type of day, random events, incidents, etc. For non-linear loads though, the load profile isn't smooth and as predictable, resulting in higher uncertainty and less accuracy using the traditional Artificial Intelligence models. Some factors that ANNs consider when developing these sorts of models: classification of load profiles of different customer classes based on the consumption of electricity, increased responsiveness of demand to predict real time electricity prices as compared to conventional grids, the need to input past demand as different components, such as peak load, base load, valley load, average load, etc. instead of joining them into a single input, and lastly, the dependence of the type on specific input variables. An example of the last case would be given the type of day, whether its weekday or weekend, that wouldn't have much of an effect on Hospital grids, but it'd be a big factor in resident housing grids' load profile.

Markov processes

As wind power continues to gain popularity, it becomes a necessary ingredient in realistic power grid studies. Off-line storage, wind variability, supply, demand, pricing, and other factors can be modelled as a mathematical game. Here the goal is to develop a winning strategy. Markov processes have been used to model and study this type of system.

== Economics ==
=== Market outlook ===
In 2009, the U.S. smart grid industry was valued at about $21.4 billion—by 2014, it will exceed at least $42.8B. Given the success of the smart grids in the U.S., the world market is expected to grow at a faster rate, surging from $69.3B in 2009 to $171.4B by 2014. With the segments set to benefit the most will be smart metering hardware sellers and makers of software used to transmit and organize the massive amount of data collected by meters.

A 2011 study from the Electric Power Research Institute concludes that investment in a U.S. smart grid will cost up to $476B over 20 years but will provide up to $2 trillion in customer benefits over that time. In 2015, the World Economic Forum reported a transformational investment of more than $7.6T by members of the OECD is needed over the next 25 years (or $300B per year) to modernize, expand, and decentralize the electricity infrastructure with technical innovation as key to the transformation. A 2019 study from International Energy Agency estimates that the current (depreciated) value of the U.S. electric grid is more than $1T. The total cost of replacing it with a smart grid is estimated to be more than $4T. If smart grids are deployed fully across the U.S., the country expects to save $130B annually.

=== General economics developments ===
As customers can choose their electricity suppliers, depending on their different tariff methods, the focus of transportation costs will be increased. Reduction of maintenance and replacements costs will stimulate more advanced control.

A smart grid precisely limits electrical power down to the residential level, networks small-scale distributed energy generation and storage devices, communicates information on operating status and needs, collects information on prices and grid conditions, and moves the grid beyond central control to a collaborative network. This decentralization allows flexible power distribution for consumers, enabling a local energy market where consumers actively participate in the distrubution of their electricity. By engaging with local energy market architectures like the peer-to-peer model, participants can potentially benefit from efficient energy usage and lower costs.

As smart grid infrastructure is integrated, the short and long term economic impacts often differ. Although the long term economic and environmental benefits of smart grid technologies are primarily positive, the implementation of smart grids is a long and tedious process that can give rise to a vulnerable period for populations dependent on the existing infrastructure.

==== United States and United Kingdom savings estimates and concerns ====
A 2003 U.S. DOE study calculated that internal modernization of U.S. grids with smart grid capabilities would save between $46B and $117B over the next 20 years if implemented within a few years of the study. As well as these industrial modernization benefits, smart grid features could expand energy efficiency beyond the grid into the home by coordinating low priority home devices such as water heaters so that their use of power takes advantage of the most desirable energy sources. Smart grids can also coordinate the production of power from large numbers of small power producers such as owners of rooftop solar panels—an arrangement that would otherwise prove problematic for power systems operators at local utilities.

One important question is whether consumers will act in response to market signals. The U.S. DOE as part of the American Recovery and Reinvestment Act Smart Grid Investment Grant and Demonstrations Program funded special consumer behavior studies to examine the acceptance, retention, and response of consumers subscribed to time-based utility rate programs that involve advanced metering infrastructure and customer systems such as in-home displays and programmable communicating thermostats.

Another concern is that the cost of telecommunications to fully support smart grids may be prohibitive. A less expensive communication mechanism is proposed using a form of "dynamic demand management" where devices shave peaks by shifting their loads in reaction to grid frequency. Grid frequency could be used to communicate load information without the need of an additional telecommunication network, but it would not support economic bargaining or quantification of contributions.

Although there are specific and proven smart grid technologies in use, smart grid is an aggregate term for a set of related technologies on which a specification is generally agreed, rather than a name for a specific technology. Some of the benefits of such a modernized electricity network include the ability to reduce power consumption at the consumer side during peak hours, called demand side management; enabling grid connection of distributed generation power (with photovoltaic arrays, small wind turbines, micro hydro, or even combined heat power generators in buildings); incorporating grid energy storage for distributed generation load balancing; and eliminating or containing failures such as widespread power grid cascading failures. The increased efficiency and reliability of the smart grid is expected to save consumers money and help reduce CO_{2} emissions.

== Oppositions and concerns ==
Most opposition and concerns have centered on smart meters and the items (such as remote control, remote disconnect, and variable rate pricing) enabled by them. Where opposition to smart meters is encountered, they are often marketed as "smart grid" which connects smart grid to smart meters in the eyes of opponents. Specific points of opposition or concern include:

- consumer concerns over privacy, e.g., use of usage data by law enforcement
- social concerns over "fair" availability of electricity
- concern that complex rate systems (e.g., variable rates) remove clarity and accountability, allowing the supplier to take advantage of the customer
- concern over remotely controllable "kill switch" incorporated into most smart meters
- social concerns over Enron style abuses of information leverage
- concerns over giving the government mechanisms to control the use of all power using activities
- concerns over RF emissions from smart meters

=== Security ===
While modernization of electrical grids into smart grids allows for optimization of everyday processes, a smart grid, being online, can be vulnerable to cyberattacks. Transformers which increase the voltage of electricity created at power plants for long-distance travel, transmission lines themselves, and distribution lines which deliver the electricity to its consumers are particularly susceptible. These systems rely on sensors which gather information from the field and then deliver it to control centers, where algorithms automate analysis and decision-making processes. These decisions are sent back to the field, where existing equipment execute them. Hackers have the potential to disrupt these automated control systems, severing the channels which allow generated electricity to be utilized. This is called a denial of service or DoS attack. They can also launch integrity attacks which corrupt information being transmitted along the system as well as desynchronization attacks which affect when such information is delivered to the appropriate location. Additionally, intruders can gain access via renewable energy generation systems and smart meters connected to the grid, taking advantage of more specialized weaknesses or ones whose security has not been prioritized. Because a smart grid has a large number of access points, like smart meters, defending all of its weak points can prove difficult. Advanced Persistent Threats (APTs) have evolved to target smart grids by reprogramming Programmable Logic Controllers (PLCs) to display false 'normal' operating conditions to operators while causing physical damage. To counter these vulnerabilities, experts recommend shifting from traditional network segmentation to 'micro-segmentation' and adopting 'zero-trust' models that require verification at every layer of the infrastructure.

There is also concern on the security of the infrastructure, primarily that involving communications technology. Concerns chiefly center around the communications technology at the heart of the smart grid. Designed to allow real-time contact between utilities and meters in customers' homes and businesses, there is a risk that these capabilities could be exploited for criminal or even terrorist actions. One of the key capabilities of this connectivity is the ability to remotely switch off power supplies, enabling utilities to quickly and easily cease or modify supplies to customers who default on payment. This is undoubtedly a massive boon for energy providers, but also raises some significant security issues. Cybercriminals have infiltrated the U.S. electric grid before on numerous occasions. Aside from computer infiltration, there are also concerns that computer malware like Stuxnet, which targeted SCADA systems which are widely used in industry, could be used to attack a smart grid network.

Electricity theft is a concern in the U.S. where the smart meters being deployed use RF technology to communicate with the electricity transmission network. People with knowledge of electronics can devise both physical and electrical interference devices to cause the smart meter to report lower than actual usage. Similarly, the same technology can be employed to make it appear that the energy the consumer is using is being used by another customer, increasing their bill. This kind of theft is known as false data injection. Smart grids present a challenge in protecting against these types of fraud, as security must account for both the decentralized physical layer and vulnerabilities in the electronic layers.

The damage from a well-executed, sizable cyberattack could be extensive and long-lasting. One incapacitated substation could take from nine days to over a year to repair, depending on the nature of the attack. It can also cause an hours-long outage in a small radius. It could have an immediate effect on transportation infrastructure, as traffic lights and other routing mechanisms as well as ventilation equipment for underground roadways is reliant on electricity. Additionally, infrastructure which relies on the electric grid, including wastewater treatment facilities, the IT sector, and communications systems could be impacted.

The December 2015 Ukraine power grid cyberattack, the first recorded of its kind, disrupted services to nearly a quarter of a million people by bringing substations offline. The Council on Foreign Relations has noted that states are most likely to be the perpetrators of such an attack as they have access to the resources to carry one out despite the high level of difficulty of doing so. Cyber intrusions can be used as portions of a larger offensive, military or otherwise. Some security experts warn that this type of event is easily scalable to grids elsewhere. Insurance company Lloyd's of London has already modeled the outcome of a cyberattack on the Eastern Interconnection, which has the potential to impact 15 states, put 93M people in the dark, and cost the country's economy anywhere from $243B to $1T in various damages.

According to the U.S. House of Representatives Subcommittee on Economic Development, Public Buildings, and Emergency Management, the electric grid has already seen a sizable number of cyber intrusions, with two in every five aiming to incapacitate it. As such, the U.S. DOE has prioritized research and development to decrease the electric grid's vulnerability to cyberattacks, citing them as an "imminent danger" in its 2017 Quadrennial Energy Review. The DOE has also identified both attack resistance and self-healing as major keys to ensuring that today's smart grid is future-proof. While there are regulations already in place, namely the Critical Infrastructure Protection Standards introduced by the North America Electric Reliability Council, a significant number of them are suggestions rather than mandates. Most electricity generation, transmission, and distribution facilities and equipment are owned by private stakeholders, further complicating the task of assessing adherence to such standards. Additionally, even if utilities want to fully comply, they may find that it is too expensive to do so.

Some experts argue that the first step to increasing the cyber defenses of the smart electric grid is completing a comprehensive risk analysis of existing infrastructure, including research of software, hardware, and communication processes. Additionally, as intrusions themselves can provide valuable information, it could be useful to analyze system logs and other records of their nature and timing. Common weaknesses already identified using such methods by the Department of Homeland Security include poor code quality, improper authentication, and weak firewall rules. Once this step is completed, some suggest that it makes sense to then complete an analysis of the potential consequences of the aforementioned failures or shortcomings. This includes both immediate consequences as well as second- and third-order cascading effects on parallel systems. Finally, risk mitigation solutions, which may include simple remediation of infrastructure inadequacies or novel strategies, can be deployed to address the situation. Some such measures include recoding of control system algorithms to make them more able to resist and recover from cyberattacks or preventive techniques that allow more efficient detection of unusual or unauthorized changes to data. Strategies to account for human error which can compromise systems include educating those who work in the field to be wary of strange USB drives, which can introduce malware if inserted, even if just to check their contents.

Other solutions include utilizing transmission substations, constrained SCADA networks, policy based data sharing, and attestation for constrained smart meters.

Transmission substations utilize one-time signature authentication technologies and one-way hash chain constructs. These constraints have since been remedied with the creation of a fast-signing and verification technology and buffering-free data processing.

A similar solution has been constructed for constrained SCADA networks. This involves applying a Hash-Based Message Authentication Code to byte streams, converting the random-error detection available on legacy systems to a mechanism that guarantees data authenticity.

Policy-based data sharing utilizes GPS-clock-synchronized-fine-grain power grid measurements to provide increased grid stability and reliability. It does this through synchro-phasor requirements that are gathered by PMUs.

Attestation for constrained smart meters faces a slightly different challenge, however. One of the biggest issues with attestation for constrained smart meters is that in order to prevent energy theft, and similar attacks, cyber security providers have to make sure that the devices' software is authentic. To combat this problem, an architecture for constrained smart networks has been created and implemented at a low level in the embedded system.

The protection system of a smart grid provides grid reliability analysis, failure protection, and security and privacy protection services. While the additional communication infrastructure of a smart grid provides additional protective and security mechanisms, it also presents a risk of external attack and internal failures. In a report on cyber security of smart grid technology first produced in 2010, and later updated in 2014, the U.S. National Institute of Standards and Technology pointed out that the ability to collect more data about energy use from customer smart meters also raises major privacy concerns, since the information stored at the meter, which is potentially vulnerable to data breaches, can be mined for personal details about customers.

== Other challenges to adoption ==
Before a utility installs an advanced metering system, or any type of smart system, it must make a business case for the investment. Some components, like the power system stabilizers (PSS) installed on generators are very expensive, require complex integration in the grid's control system, are needed only during emergencies, and are only effective if other suppliers on the network have them. Without any incentive to install them, power suppliers don't. Most utilities find it difficult to justify installing a communications infrastructure for a single application (e.g., meter reading). Because of this, a utility must typically identify several applications that will use the same communications infrastructure—for example, reading a meter, monitoring power quality, remote connection and disconnection of customers, enabling demand response, etc. Ideally, the communications infrastructure will not only support near-term applications, but unanticipated applications that will arise in the future. Regulatory or legislative actions can also drive utilities to implement pieces of a smart grid puzzle. Each utility has a unique set of business, regulatory, and legislative drivers that guide its investments. This means that each utility will take a different path to creating their smart grid and that different utilities will create smart grids at different adoption rates.

Some features of smart grids draw opposition from industries that currently are, or hope to provide similar services. An example is competition with cable and DSL Internet providers from broadband over powerline internet access. Providers of SCADA control systems for grids have intentionally designed proprietary hardware, protocols and software so that they cannot inter-operate with other systems in order to tie its customers to the vendor.

The incorporation of digital communications and computer infrastructure with the grid's existing physical infrastructure poses challenges and inherent vulnerabilities. According to IEEE Security & Privacy, the smart grid will require that people develop and use large computer and communication infrastructure that supports a greater degree of situational awareness and that allows for more specific command and control operations. This process is necessary to support major systems such as demand-response wide-area measurement and control, storage and transportation of electricity, and the automation of electric distribution.

=== Power Theft / Power Loss ===
Various "smart grid" systems have dual functions. This includes Advanced Metering Infrastructure systems which, when used with various software can be used to detect power theft and by process of elimination, detect where equipment failures have taken place. These are in addition to their primary functions of eliminating the need for human meter reading and measuring the time-of-use of electricity.

As of 2013, the worldwide power loss including theft is estimated at $200B annually. Confirmed incidences of energy theft within the commercial consumers sector increased 276% from 2022 to 2026.

Electricity theft also represents a major challenge when providing reliable electrical service in developing countries. The decentralized power allocation that smart grids enable is not always a realistic model in developing countries with limited resources and outdated infrastructure, where stealing electricty is often seen as a social norm necessary for survival.

== Deployments and attempted deployments ==
=== Enel ===
The earliest, and one of the largest, example of a smart grid is the Italian system installed by Enel S.p.A. of Italy. Completed in 2005, the Telegestore project was highly unusual in the utility world because the company designed and manufactured their own meters, acted as their own system integrator, and developed their own system software. The Telegestore project is widely regarded as the first commercial scale use of smart grid technology to the home, and delivers annual savings of €500M at a project cost of €2.1B.

=== U.S. DOE - ARRA Smart Grid Project ===
One of the largest deployment programs in the world to-date is the U.S. Dept. of Energy's Smart Grid Program funded by the American Recovery and Reinvestment Act of 2009. This program required matching funding from individual utilities. A total of over $9B in Public/Private funds were invested as part of this program. Technologies included Advanced Metering Infrastructure, including over 65M Advanced "Smart" Meters, Customer Interface Systems, Distribution & Substation Automation, Volt/VAR Optimization Systems, over 1,000 Synchrophasors, Dynamic Line Rating, Cyber Security Projects, Advanced Distribution Management Systems, Energy Storage Systems, and Renewable Energy Integration Projects. This program consisted of Investment Grants (matching), Demonstration Projects, Consumer Acceptance Studies, and Workforce Education Programs. Reports from all individual utility programs as well as overall impact reports will be completed by the second quarter of 2015.

In the U.S., the Energy Policy Act of 2005 and Title XIII of the Energy Independence and Security Act of 2007 are providing funding to encourage smart grid development. The objective is to enable utilities to better predict their needs, and in some cases involve consumers in a time-of-use tariff. Funds have also been allocated to develop more robust energy control technologies.

=== Austin, Texas ===
In the US, Andres Carvallo, CIO at Austin Energy in the city of Austin, Texas, pioneer working on building its smart grid since 2003, when its utility first replaced 1/3 of its manual meters with smart meters that communicate via a wireless mesh network. Carvallo coined the term smart grid on March 5, 2004 and was a co-author of the Energy Independence and Security Act of 2007 and of its section title XIII. Carvallo also led the $4B transformation over eight years that brought to Austin solar power, wind power, CPH power, EV charging, fiber to every substation, the very first ADMS co-developed with GE, the deployment of the very first Virtual Power Plant managing over 100,000 thermostats using Converge technology (now part of Itron), and the replacement of all software systems. In that journey, Austin Energy deployed a full two-way power flow and two-way data flow smart grid by 2009 with technology from GE, IBM, Oracle and Cisco. It currently manages over 500,000 devices real-time (smart meters, smart thermostats, and distribution sensors across its service area), and services 2.1M consumers and 43,000 businesses.

=== Boulder, Colorado ===
Boulder, Colorado, completed the first phase of its smart grid project in August 2008. Both systems use the smart meter as a gateway to the home automation network (HAN) that controls smart sockets and devices. Some HAN designers favor decoupling control functions from the meter, out of concern of future mismatches with new standards and technologies available from the fast moving business segment of home electronic devices.

=== Hydro One ===
Hydro One, in Ontario, Canada is in the midst of a large-scale Smart Grid initiative, deploying a standards-compliant communications infrastructure from Trilliant. By the end of 2010, the system will serve 1.3M customers in the province of Ontario. The initiative won the "Best AMR Initiative in North America" award from the Utility Planning Network.

=== Île d'Yeu ===
Île d'Yeu began a 2-year pilot program in Spring of 2020. Twenty-three houses in the Ker Pissot neighborhood and surrounding areas were interconnected with a microgrid that was automated as a smart grid with software from Engie. Sixty-four solar panels with a peak capacity of 23.7 kW were installed on five houses and a battery with a storage capacity of 15 kWh was installed on one house. Six houses store excess solar energy in their hot water heaters. A dynamic system apportions the energy provided by the solar panels and stored in the battery and hot water heaters to the system of 23 houses. The smart grid software dynamically updates energy supply and demand in 5 minute intervals, deciding whether to pull energy from the battery or from the panels and when to store it in the hot water heaters. This pilot program was the first such project in France.

=== E-Energy ===
In the so-called E-Energy projects several German utilities are creating first nucleolus in six independent model regions. A technology competition run by the Federal Ministry for Economic Affairs and Energy and the Federal Ministry for Environment identified these model regions to carry out research and development activities with the main objective to create an "Internet of Energy" and to develop technologies that maximise energy efficiency.

=== Mannheim ===
The City of Mannheim in Germany is using realtime Broadband Powerline (BPL) communications in its Model City Mannheim "MoMa" project. The project was one of six E-Energy Projects funded by Germany's Federal Environment Ministry. Integrated Information and Communication Technology allows consumers to maximize the efficiency of renewable energy sources that account for around 25% of Germany's electricity generation. By giving consumers direct access to their energy usage and spending, the project enabled residents to decrease energy consumption by 10% and save 15% on their energy bills.

=== Australia ===
In 2009, Sydney, Australia, implemented the Smart Grid, Smart City program in partnership with the Australian Government. The Government granted the electric distribution company Ausgrid $93 million for the development of a sustainable smart grid energy network that could increase renewable energy usage in the areas of New South Wales and Sydney. This project aimed to test smart grid's efficiency in integrating with consumer's daily lives, with renewable energy sources, and with the National Broadband Network. Although Ausgrid implemented this project through February 2014, with individual projects fully implemented by late 2010, there is not comprehensive data on the success of this program due to the abstract nature of the original objectives as well as difficulties in administrative oversight within the Australian Government.

=== Évora ===
InovGrid is a project in Évora, Portugal that aims to equip the electricity grid with information and devices to automate grid management, improve service quality, reduce operating costs, promote energy efficiency and environmental sustainability, and increase the penetration of renewable energies and electric vehicles. It will be possible to control and manage the state of the entire electricity distribution grid at any given instant, allowing suppliers and energy services companies to use this technological platform to offer consumers information and added-value energy products and services. This project to install an intelligent energy grid places Portugal and EDP at the cutting edge of technological innovation and service provision in Europe.

=== Massachusetts ===
One of the first attempted deployments of "smart grid" technologies in the U.S. was rejected in 2009 by electricity regulators in the Commonwealth of Massachusetts, a U.S. state. According to an article in the Boston Globe, Northeast Utilities' Western Massachusetts Electric Co. subsidiary actually attempted to create a "smart grid" program using public subsidies that would switch low income customers from post-pay to pre-pay billing (using "smart cards") in addition to special hiked "premium" rates for electricity used above a predetermined amount. This plan was rejected by regulators as it "eroded important protections for low-income customers against shutoffs". According to the Boston Globe, the plan "unfairly targeted low-income customers and circumvented Massachusetts laws meant to help struggling consumers keep the lights on". A spokesman for an environmental group supportive of smart grid plans and Western Massachusetts' Electric's aforementioned "smart grid" plan, in particular, stated "If used properly, smart grid technology has a lot of potential for reducing peak demand, which would allow us to shut down some of the oldest, dirtiest power plants... It's a tool."

=== eEnergy Vermont consortium ===
The eEnergy Vermont consortium is a U.S. statewide initiative in Vermont, funded in part through the American Recovery and Reinvestment Act of 2009, in which all of the electric utilities in the state have rapidly adopted a variety of Smart Grid technologies, including about 90% Advanced Metering Infrastructure deployment, and are presently evaluating a variety of dynamic rate structures.

=== Netherlands ===
In the Netherlands a large-scale project (>5000 connections, >20 partners) was initiated to demonstrate integrated smart grids technologies, services and business cases. The Netherlands is also home to Schoonship, a neighborhood in Amsterdam consisting of 46 houses that float on the Johan van Hasselt Canal. The community is powered by a smart grid which allows residents to use and trade energy from solar panels. The original plan was designed by Dutch company Space&Matter and implemented in 2010.

=== Chattanooga ===
EPB in Chattanooga, TN is a municipally owned electric utility that started construction of a smart grid in 2008, receiving a $111,567,606 grant from the U.S. DOE in 2009 to expedite construction and implementation (for a total budget of $232,219,350). Deployment of power-line interrupters (1170 units) was completed in April 2012, and deployment of smart meters (172,079 units) was completed in 2013. The smart grid's backbone fiber-optic system was also used to provide the first gigabit-speed internet connection to residential customers in the U.S. through the Fiber to the Home initiative, and now speeds of up to 10 gigabits per second are available to residents. The smart grid is estimated to have reduced power outages by an average of 60%, saving the city about $60 annually. It has also reduced the need for "truck rolls" to scout and troubleshoot faults, resulting in an estimated reduction of 630,000 truck driving miles, and 4.7M pounds of carbon emissions. In January 2016, EPB became the first major power distribution system to earn Performance Excellence in Electricity Renewal (PEER) certification.

=== OpenADR Implementations ===
Certain deployments utilize the OpenADR standard for load shedding and demand reduction during higher demand periods.

==== China ====
The smart grid market in China is estimated to be $22.3B with a projected growth to $61.4B by 2015. Honeywell is developing a demand response pilot and feasibility study for China with the State Grid Corp. of China using the OpenADR demand response standard. The State Grid Corp., the Chinese Academy of Sciences, and General Electric intend to work together to develop standards for China's smart grid rollout.

==== United States ====
In 2009, the U.S. DOE awarded an $11M grant to Southern California Edison and Honeywell for a demand response program that automatically turns down energy use during peak hours for participating industrial customers. The DOE awarded an $11.4M grant to Honeywell to implement the program using the OpenADR standard.

Hawaiian Electric Co. (HECO) is implementing a two-year pilot project to test the ability of an ADR program to respond to the intermittence of wind power. Hawaii has a goal to obtain 70% of its power from renewable sources by 2030. HECO will give customers incentives for reducing power consumption within 10 minutes of a notice.

== Guidelines, standards and user groups ==
Part of the IEEE Smart Grid Initiative, IEEE 2030.2 represents an extension of the work aimed at utility storage systems for transmission and distribution networks. The IEEE P2030 group expects to deliver early 2011 an overarching set of guidelines on smart grid interfaces. The new guidelines will cover areas including batteries and supercapacitors as well as flywheels. The group has also spun out a 2030.1 effort drafting guidelines for integrating electric vehicles into the smart grid.

IEC TC 57 has created a family of international standards that can be used as part of the smart grid. These standards include IEC 61850 which is an architecture for substation automation, and IEC 61970/61968—the Common Information Model (CIM). The CIM provides for common semantics to be used for turning data into information.

OpenADR is an open-source smart grid communications standard used for demand response applications. It is typically used to send information and signals to cause electrical power-using devices to be turned off during periods of higher demand.

MultiSpeak has created a specification that supports distribution functionality of the smart grid. MultiSpeak has a robust set of integration definitions that supports nearly all of the software interfaces necessary for a distribution utility or for the distribution portion of a vertically integrated utility. MultiSpeak integration is defined using extensible markup language (XML) and web services.

The IEEE has created a standard to support synchrophasors—C37.118.

The UCA International User Group discusses and supports real world experience of the standards used in smart grids.

A utility task group within LonMark International deals with smart grid related issues.

There is a growing trend toward the use of TCP/IP technology as a common communication platform for smart meter applications, so that utilities can deploy multiple communication systems, while using IP technology as a common management platform.

IEEE P2030 is an IEEE project developing a "Draft Guide for Smart Grid Interoperability of Energy Technology and Information Technology Operation with the Electric Power System (EPS), and End-Use Applications and Loads".

NIST has included ITU-T G.hn as one of the "Standards Identified for Implementation" for the Smart Grid "for which it believed there was strong stakeholder consensus". G.hn is standard for high-speed communications over power lines, phone lines and coaxial cables.

OASIS EnergyInterop'—An OASIS technical committee developing XML standards for energy interoperation. Its starting point is the California OpenADR standard.

Under the Energy Independence and Security Act of 2007 (EISA), NIST is charged with overseeing the identification and selection of hundreds of standards that will be required to implement the Smart Grid in the U.S. These standards will be referred by NIST to the Federal Energy Regulatory Commission (FERC). This work has begun, and the first standards have already been selected for inclusion in NIST's Smart Grid catalog. However, some commentators have suggested that the benefits that could be realized from Smart Grid standardization could be threatened by a growing number of patents that cover Smart Grid architecture and technologies. If patents that cover standardized Smart Grid elements are not revealed until technology is broadly distributed throughout the network ("locked-in"), significant disruption could occur when patent holders seek to collect unanticipated rents from large segments of the market.

== GridWise Alliance rankings ==
In November 2017 the non-profit GridWise Alliance along with Clean Edge Inc., a clean energy group, released rankings for all 50 states in their efforts to modernize the electric grid. California was ranked number one. The other top states were Illinois, Texas, Maryland, Oregon, Arizona, the District of Columbia, New York, Nevada and Delaware. "The 30-plus page report from the GridWise Alliance, which represents stakeholders that design, build and operate the electric grid, takes a deep dive into grid modernization efforts across the country and ranks them by state."

== See also ==
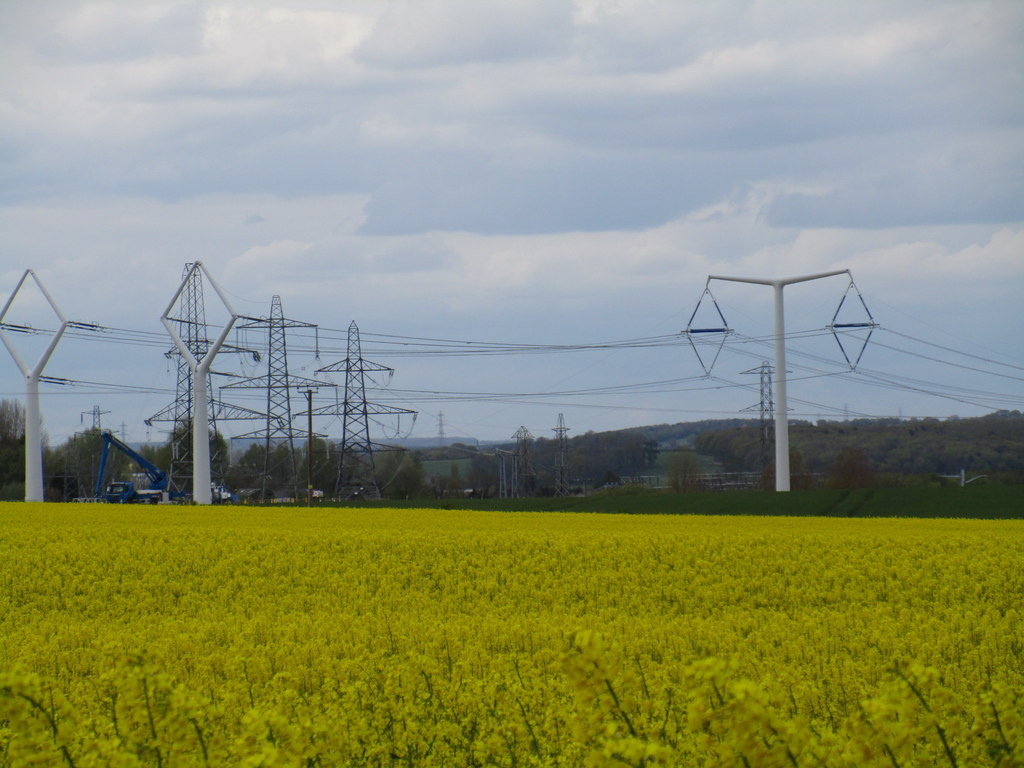
End of line of T-pylons

- Charge control
- Common Smart Inverter Profile
- Electranet
- Graphene-clad wire
- Grid friendly
- Grid energy storage
- Home energy storage
- Large-scale energy storage
- List of energy storage projects
- Microgrid
- Net metering
- Open smart grid protocol
- Smart grids by country
- Smart villages in Asia
- Super grid
- T-pylons
- Vehicle-to-grid (V2G)
- Virtual power plant
- Wide area synchronous grid
- Smart city

== Bibliography ==
- Hans Glavitsch (November 1974). "Computer Control of Electric-Power Systems". Scientific American. Vol. 231, no. 5.
- Christian Neureiter, A Domain-Specific, Model Driven Engineering Approach For Systems Engineering In The Smart Grid, MBSE4U, 2017, ISBN 978-3981852929
