= Smart grids in Austria =

Although there is no standard global definition, the European Technology Platform SmartGrids defines smart grids as electricity networks that can intelligently integrate the behaviour and actions of all users connected to it – generators, consumers and those that do both – in order to efficiently deliver sustainable, economic and secure electricity supplies.

== The situation in Austria ==
The Austrian E-Control lists following requirements a smart grid must meet:

- Available in sufficient amounts;
- Secure and of good quality;
- Affordable;
- Environmentally friendly;
- Socially acceptable.

There are currently around 100,000 smart meters installed in Austria. Those are spread among six pioneer regions which function as independent projects and serve with findings in various aspects concerning the implementation of Smart Grids on a broad basis.

The challenges yet to overcome for the installation on a nationwide level are the technical requirements, the compatibility, the gap between norms for Power Line Carrier on their last mile, data privacy and a more flexible law on gauging and measuring.

Producing hydroenergy on a small (private) basis does have a tradition in Austria. With Smart Grids making use of that, this branch is bound to become a lot more interesting and valuable for the society, in the future.

=== Benefits and goals ===
It is the task of the Network Operators to optimise usage of the net infrastructure. This can be achieved by improving communication between energy customer, provider and storage facilities.

Benefits for the customer: First and foremost, it should guarantee a reliable energy supply in Austria. Another main goal is, to enhance possibilities of including small energy suppliers into the energy network. (decentralised energy production) This should enhance quality and lower costs.

Successful roll-out of smart grids technologies would bring many benefits, including:

- High level of security and quality of supply;
- Efficient use of resources leading to cost savings for consumers;
- Transparent and non-discriminatory grid connection and access for all system users;
- Maximisation of the cross-border transmission capacity available to the European electricity market;
- Coordinated planning and development of national and European network infrastructure;
- Reduction of CO_{2} emissions and increased efficiency through optimum integration of distributed renewable generation.

=== Research and political measures ===
In Austria, there is targeted research on Smart Grids since 2003. Since 2008 the National Technology Platform Smart Grids Austria (SGA) was formed by Stakeholders of the national energy sector (Innovative Grid Operators, Researchers, Industry, Suppliers, Consumers). The SGA since then came up

The Austrian Klimafonds has a Budget of €500 Mio that are used for projects to reduce CO_{2} emissions, enhance energy efficiency, conduct R&D on renewables and investments into making new technologies available for economic use. The "realisation of innovative networks" is one of the subgoals in their program. In addition to that, Smart Grids are declared to be one measure to reduce CO_{2} emissions.

There are currently 24 Projects run by private companies around the Smart Grid technology supported by the Austrian Klimafonds and FFG, that are being concluded in the years 2011 and 2012 and have a total volume of €10.3 Mio.

Another impact is, that the Austrian Institute of Technology (AIT) opened up a Smart Grids Lab in July 2010. Their research teams are helping the industry to develop new electronic network components and analysing their interaction with the power grid.

The Federal Ministry for Transport, Innovation and Technology initialised a cooperation with Swiss and German partners. The goal is to research information and strategies for implementing Smartg Grids, on the basis of experiences from research and pilot projects for the development and testing Smart grid solutions. By the end of 2010 the working program should be published in form of a brochure.
