= Smart grids by country =

This is an article on smart grids by country. The term smart grid is most commonly defined as an electric grid that has been digitized to enable two way communication between producers and consumers. The objective of the smart grid is to update electricity infrastructure to include more advanced communication, control, and sensory technology with the hope of increasing communication between consumers and energy producers. The potential benefits from a smart grid include increased reliability, more efficient electricity use, better economics, and improved sustainability. The concept of a smart grid began to emerge in the early 2000s. Since then, many countries have been pursuing a smart grid. Each country has their own unique definition of a smart grid based on their own policies and objectives. Therefore, every country approaches achieving a smart grid a little different. Below is an overview of major smart grid legislation and projects in select countries.

== Australia ==
The Australian government has committed to investing $100M in smart grids. The federal government's call for proposals to study smart grid technology in 2009 was followed by an announcement of a winning team in June 2010. The study, intended to increase customer awareness and engagement in energy usage and establish distributed demand management and distributed generation management, will commence in Summer 2010. EnergyAustralia, announced as the lead utility in the federally sponsored consortium to study Smart Grid in Australia, will build the smart grid over five sites in New South Wales with partners IBM, Grid Net, a San Francisco-based energy software company, and GE Energy. The WiMAX-based smart grid will support such applications as Substation Automation and plug-in hybrid electric vehicles (PEV), ultimately supporting 50,000 Smart Meters and 15,000 in-home devices (IHDs) as well. Within Australia the adoption of smart grids is hindered by a lack of service level obligations on electricity distribution businesses to connect distributed generation devices in a timely fashion.

== Brazil ==
Brazil's smart grid efforts have primarily focused on diversifying their generation sources and enhancing the electric grid infrastructure. There are three driving forces behind that focus. The first driving force is high electric demand growth from the last twenty years that is projected to continue. Brazil is making great efforts to keep up with growing electricity demand and it factors heavily into their smart grid policy decisions. The second driving force is their current over reliance on hydroelectricity. Brazil's strong dependence on hydroelectricity makes their electricity supply vulnerable to shortages during drought seasons. Brazil's smart grid policy agenda intends to address this by encouraging the development of other sources of electricity generation. The third driving force is Brazil's high non-technical losses. Brazil hopes to implement modern smart grid technology to reduce these losses.

Brazil is working hard to address electricity generation diversity by implementing energy auctions for a variety of energy generation sources. Biomass is one of the sources Brazil is investing in to diversify its generation mix. Biomass currently represents the third largest electricity generation source in Brazil. Biomass is a preferable source in Brazil because of the prevalence of agriculture, especially sugarcane and its peak generation season correlates well with the hydroelectric valley season. In 2012, Brazil introduced a new amendment that would require local distributors to acquire at least 2 GW of biomass generation every year for 10 years. In addition to encouraging investment in biomass generation, Brazil is also promoting wind generation. Similar to biomass generation, wind is a preferable source because its peak generation season also correlates with the hydroelectric valley season. Wind generation potential is estimated to be 143.5 GW. Brazil began energy auctions for wind energy in 2009 and hope to have an installed capacity of 11 GW. Generation auctions were also arranged for solar electricity beginning in 2013. The solar market in Brazil is much smaller than he market for wind and biomass but it is growing with assistance from the government.

In addition to generation expansion, Brazil is also planning an extensive smart meter rollout. In 2012 the Brazil electricity regulatory authority decreed that all new residential and rural consumers shall be given a smart meter. Existing customers that desire to have a smart grid may request one. Green Tech Media estimates that 27 million smart meters will be installed by 2030. Brazil hopes that the installation of smart meters will help to reduce their non-technical losses.

== China ==
China's Smart Grid efforts are focused on three key areas. The first focus area is on expanding generation, to address the explosive growth of electricity demand over the last 20 years; which is expected to continue . The second focus area correlates with expanding generation and focuses on expanding China's electricity transmission and distribution systems. China's third area of focus is on reducing the environmental impact of their electricity generation sector.

China is a pursuing an all of the above strategy to fulfill their generation needs. Coal and petroleum currently represent the vast majority of China's generation mix and this trend will continue with their generation expansion plan. China has plans to build nine new coal plants by 2015. China will also include nuclear generation in their expansion plan. The 12thFive Year Plan dictates that 40 GW will be installed by 2015. China also has plans to expand their renewable generation. The largest expansion will come from hydroelectricity, which is expected to be expanded to 120 GW . Wind generation expansion will include 70 GW of capacity and solar generation will include 5 GW of installed capacity.

To support the aggressive generation expansion plan, there are extensive plans to expand transmission as well. Expanding transmission lines will help China to connect new generation to demand centers and integrate the seven separate power grids that currently exist in China. Much of China's new transmission will be ultra-high voltage (UHV) lines. The UHV lines should transfer power at lower cost with fewer losses. On May 21, 2009, China has announced an aggressive framework for Smart Grid deployment. Comparing with US and Europe, the Chinese Smart Grid appears to be more transmission-centric.

To address emission concerns, the 12th Five Year Plan dictates that CO_{2} emissions will be reduced by 17% per unit of GDP. To accomplish reaching this goal, China has two initiatives planned for the electricity sector. First, increasing energy efficiency until consumption is reduced by 16% per unit of GDP by 2015. This will be accomplished with the deployment of various consumer education programs and smart meter apps so consumers can be educated about their electricity use. The 12th Five Year Plan also discusses installing smart substations and smart control algorithms to reduce voltage fluctuations and improve power quality which will increase electricity efficiency. The second initiative involves reducing the pollution generated from coal plants. China has heavily invested in clean coal technology (CCT) to address emissions from coal plants. China is deploying CCT in all new plants and closing older plants that are more polluting.

As part of its current 5-year plan, China is building a Wide Area Monitoring system (WAMS) and by 2012 plans to have PMU sensors at all generators of 300 megawatts and above, and all substations of 500 kilovolts and above. All generation and transmission is tightly controlled by the state, so standards and compliance processes are rapid. Requirements to use the same PMUs from the same Chinese manufacturer and stabilizers conforming to the same state specified are strictly adhered to. All communications are via broadband using a private network, so data flows to control centers without significant time delays.

== European Union ==
Development of smart grid technologies is part of the European Technology Platform (ETP) initiative and is called the SmartGrids Technology platform. The SmartGrids European Technology Platform for Electricity Networks of the Future began its work in 2005. Its aim is to formulate and promote a vision for the development of European electricity networks towards 2020 and beyond. The concept of smart grids in Europe as now starting to be deployed was developed in 2006 by the European Technology Platform for Smart Grids. Such concept concerns an electricity network that can intelligently integrate the actions of all users connected to it - generators, consumers and those that do both - in order to efficiently deliver sustainable, economic and secure electricity supplies. European Technology Platform identifies that smart grid employs innovative products and services together with intelligent monitoring, control, communication, and self-healing technologies in order to:

- better facilitate the connection and operation of generators of all sizes and technologies.
- allow consumers to play a part in optimising the operation of the system.
- provide consumers with greater information and options for choice of supply.
- significantly reduce the environmental impact of the whole electricity supply system.
- maintain or even improve the existing high levels of system reliability, quality and security of supply.
- maintain and improve the existing services efficiently and foster market integration towards a European integrated market.

The EU aims to replace 80% of current electricity meters with smart meters by 2020 wherever cost-benefit analysis demonstrates a positive result. This smart metering and smart grids rollout can reduce emissions in the EU by up to 9% and annual household energy consumption by similar amounts. On 30 November 2016, the Commission published a proposal stating that all consumers should be entitled to request a smart meter from their supplier. Smart meters should allow consumers to reap the benefits of the progressive digitalisation of the energy market via several different functions. Consumers should also be able to access dynamic electricity price contracts. A 2014 Commission report on the deployment of smart metering found:

- close to 200 million smart meters for electricity and 45 million for gas will be rolled out in the EU by 2020. This represents a potential investment of €45 billion.
- by 2020, it is expected that almost 72% of European consumers will have a smart meter for electricity. About 40% will have one for gas.
- the cost of installing a smart meter in the EU is on average between €200 and €250.
- on average, smart meters provide savings of €160 for gas and €309 for electricity per metering point (distributed amongst consumers, suppliers, distribution system operators, etc.) as well as an average energy saving of 3%.

== South Africa ==
South Africa has smart grid efforts are focused around three objectives: increasing the penetration of renewable generation, decarbonizing their electricity generation and improving network reliability and availability.

To achieve the objective of increasing renewable generation, South Africa began hosting renewable energy auctions in 2010. Eligible technologies include onshore wind, solar thermal, solar PV, biomass, biogas, landfill gas, and small hydro. The independent power producers (IPP) can bid anywhere between 1-75 MW and winners receive their bidden rate for 25 years. As of 2013, 2.47 GW of renewable capacity had been contracted.

To achieve the objective of decarbonizing their electricity generation, South Africa is employing three strategies. The first is incorporating more renewable generation though the IPP energy auctions discussed above. The second strategy involves increasing their gas generation. The 2013 South Africa Integrated Resource Plan Update (IRP) projected that 800 MW of co-generation, 2.37 GW of combined cycle gas turbine (CCGT) and 3.9 GW of open cycle gas turbine (OCGT) would be built by 2030. The third strategy being considered is an emissions cap, carbon tax, or carbon budget. The goal of either mechanism would be to keep the emissions from electricity generation between 95 – 193 million tons per annum (MT/a) by 2050.

To address the final objective of improving network reliability and availability South Africa plans to expand their transmission and distribution grids. The 2013 IRP identified five transmission line corridors that would be needed to help connect new generation to demand centers.

== South Korea ==
The Korean government has launched a $65 million pilot program on Jeju Island with major players in the industry. The program consists of a fully integrated smart grid system for 6000 households; wind farms and four distribution lines are included in the pilot program. This demonstrates the extent of Korea's commitment towards an environmentally viable future.

Korea plans to slash overall energy consumption by 3% and cut down total electric energy consumption by 10% before 2030. The government also plans to reduce greenhouse gas emissions by 41 million tons by this time. The government has announced that it will undertake a nationwide Smart Grid implementation by 2030.

In January 2010, Korea has taken a significant step forward in its efforts to grab a foothold in the global smart grid sector, coming to a deal with the state of Illinois to jointly develop and test technologies for smart grid. The two parties have signed a memorandum of understanding with the Illinois Department of Commerce to set up a pilot program to create smart grid technology at a facility on Jeju Island. Under the plan, technologies that are developed through this partnership and are deemed viable for commercialization will be rolled out both in Illinois as well as in Korean cities. The two sides agreed to launch a business model for a smart grid on Jeju-do Island and apply it in Seoul and Chicago later on. The Korea Electrotechnology Research Institute and other related local centers will come together with Illinois' Argonne National Laboratory and Chicago University to test and develop technologies.

A joint cooperation committee will be established to draw up a detailed cooperation program for the next three years. The Korean government seeks to complete the installation of smart grid in the country by 2030 and establish another 27,000 or more power charge stations for electric cars. A total of 27.5 trillion won will be injected according to the roadmap. The government plans to handle it by developing core technology, new markets, new infrastructure and attracting voluntary investment from businesses.

== United Kingdom ==
The Smart Grid Forum had identified that smart technology would give energy consumers greater control of their energy use, bills, greater security of supply and enable the use of less carbon. It had further indicated that integration of smart grids with regular technology would potentially save up to £12 billion by 2050 and deliver 9,000 additional jobs and create a £5 billion export market. To complete the transition to smart grids, the United Kingdom plans to roll out 53 million smart meters to 26 million households from 2015 to 2020. Initiated by Department of Energy and Climate Change under the Cameron-Clegg coalition from 2010 - 2015 and now under Department for Business, Energy and Industrial Strategy and Office of Gas and Electricity Markets, the (rollout of) smart meters are estimated to cost £11 Billion, providing the British economy a net £6.7 Billion benefit. Smart Energy UK identifies the different roles of six stakeholders involved in the rollout of smart meters:

- Government: Fitting smart meters, creating a new wireless communications grid and ensuring everyone gets the benefits
- Ofgem: making sure consumers are protected during the foundation stage, installation stage and far beyond it, and ensuring that the energy suppliers stick to the standards set out in the Smart Metering Installation Code of Practice (SMICOP)
- The Data Communications Company: an Ofgem agency providing the communications infrastructure that handles smart meter data and making sure that smart meters send the right information to ensure bills are accurate
- Energy Suppliers: selling and fitting smart meters; they need to abide by the rules and regulations set out in the Code of Practice (SMICOP), including making sure people know how smart meters work and how to control their data
- Smart Energy GB: informing the benefits of smart meters and helping customers understand how to use them in households
- Partners of Smart Energy GB: trusted organisations, charities and individuals that will work with Smart Energy GB to inform the public about smart meters.

== United States ==
Support for smart grids became federal policy with passage of the Energy Independence and Security Act of 2007. The law, Title13, sets out $100 million in funding per fiscal year from 2008 to 2012, establishes a matching program to states, utilities and consumers to build smart grid capabilities, and creates a Grid Modernization Commission to assess the benefits of demand response and to recommend needed protocol standards. The Energy Independence and Security Act of 2007 directs the National Institute of Standards and Technology to coordinate the development of smart grid standards, which FERC would then promulgate through official rulemakings. Smart grids received further support with the passage of the American Recovery and Reinvestment Act of 2009, which set aside $11 billion for the creation of a smart grid.

== See also ==
- Unified Smart Grid (USA)
- Open smart grid protocol
- Smart grids in Austria
