= IEEE 2030 =

Project that developed a "Guide for Smart Grid Interoperability"

IEEE 2030 was a project of the standards association of the Institute of Electrical and Electronics Engineers (IEEE) that developed a "Guide for Smart Grid Interoperability of Energy Technology and Information Technology Operation with the Electric Power System (EPS), and End-Use Applications and Loads".

== Goals ==
The group provided guidelines for smart grid interoperability. It included a knowledge base addressing terminology, characteristics, functional performance and evaluation criteria, and the application of engineering principles for smart grid interoperability of the electric power system with end-use applications and loads. It also discussed alternate approaches to best practices and how to minimize the impact of lagging participants on compliant ones.

=== Security concerns ===
A major goal was to minimize the potential for exploits of insecure AMI "smart meters" which contain "buggy software that's easily hacked," according to Mike Davis of IOActive, who demonstrated how to take over thousands at once at the Black Hat USA 2009 conference. Davis claims that the "vast majority" of such meters use no encryption and ask for no authentication before carrying out sensitive functions such as running software updates and severing customers from the power grid.

=== Government view ===
According to the group chair, Dick DeBlasio, program manager at the National Renewable Energy Lab facility of the U.S. Department of Energy and IEEE smart grid liaison to the National Institute of Standards and Technology, the project intends to bring "intelligence and standardization to the way energy is transmitted, distributed, managed and kept secure. And it strongly addresses the need to reduce energy transmission's carbon footprint... provide urgently needed guidelines for smart grid interoperability, building on the many technologies used in the electric power system and merging these with communication, monitoring, and analysis technologies and capabilities."

=== Industry view ===
According to Intel, the project will develop "open standards that will empower energy consumers and drive rapid integration of renewable energy sources, smart buildings, electric vehicles and other intelligent systems."

=== Community and user view ===
The primary purpose of IEEE 2030 is to "permit two way power flow with communication and control...to promote a more reliable and flexible electric power system." Power users (consumer and other) would perceive P2030 as a faster unification of meter, sensor and event data that offers more choice of peak curtailment notification services and power rationing or prioritizing in shortage or outage situations. In other words, as resilient community capabilities.

=== Indirect effects ===
Because the communication standards used provide more bandwidth than is required for power control, side effects of meeting reliability and security requirements would include the availability of additional bandwidth for other services (burglary, fire, medical and environmental sensors and alarms, ULC and CCTV monitoring, access control and keying systems, intercoms and secure phone line services running over AC power lines). Services such as radio, TV and general Internet could also run over the same infrastructure as their security needs are far less demanding than power or alarm systems. However, standardizing the tariffs or interfaces for non-power-control applications is not a function of IEEE 2030 itself, no matter how influential its standards may eventually prove for such services. Most such devices are expected to migrate to the more efficient DC Power over Ethernet interfaces over the period in which the project intended to influence AC power standards. Only those that continue to draw AC power directly would participate in controls that it defined.

== Sponsored by SCC21 ==
The project was sponsored by IEEE Standards Coordinating Committee 21 (SCC21). It was part of the IEEE Smart Grid initiative.

The standard was published in September 2011 after approval.
