= Dynamic line rating for electric utilities =

Transmission operating philosophy based on real-time adaptation to weather

Dynamic line rating (DLR), also known as real-time thermal rating (RTTR), is an electric power transmission operation philosophy aiming at maximizing load, when environmental conditions allow it, without compromising safety. Research, prototyping and pilot projects were initiated in the 1990s, but the emergence of the "smart grid" stimulated electric utilities, scientists and vendors to develop comprehensive and sustainable solutions.

== Principles and applications ==
The current-carrying capacity, or ampacity, of overhead lines starts with the type of conductor used. The conductor choice determines its electrical resistance and other physical parameters for dynamic line rating (DLR). Electric current passing through the conductor causes heating according to Joule's first law, resulting in the conductor expanding and the line sagging. Transmission ratings are set with a maximum allowable conductor temperature (annealing temperature) and minimum clearance rules to comply with legislation and regulation.

Ampacity has traditionally been limited by conductor thermal capacity defined in terms of stating rating (SR), based on a predetermined set of worst-case weather scenarios (typically a combination of cross-winds, high solar radiation and seasonal high ambient temperatures).

=== Real-time dynamic line rating ===
More often than not, there are unused margins between the limits defined by static ratings and the "true limits" measured by a DLR or real-time thermal rating (RTTR) system. Several methods have been developed since the 1990s, most of which rely upon sensors deployed on overhead lines to measure parameters in real-time. Other systems utilize weather stations that monitor environmental conditions without contacting the line. Data received from any method is reported to a main computer for processing. Control center operators access usable data (line temperature, ratings, forecasts, historical values) in pseudo-real-time through a human-machine interface (HMI).

=== Wind generation ===
Wind generation is most feasible in an area that has consistent wind conditions. When prospecting such locations, the grid connection point must also be analyzed. Adding new generation to a grid typically requires an infrastructure buildup that can potentially cost millions of dollars. In some circumstances a phenomenon, known as concurrent cooling, can be utilized to mitigate the expenses. Concurrent cooling is the cooling of transmission lines, thus increasing ampacity, when the wind power is generating. The exact parameters of the system are vital to determine feasibility.

=== Dynamic line rating reception ===
DLR methods and technologies are considered "mature" by industry groups like European Network of Transmission System Operators for Electricity (ENTSO-E) after field validations for various applications. Transmission utilities in Asia, Europe, North America, and South America have included deployment of DLR in their grid development roadmaps. Institute of Electrical and Electronics Engineers (IEEE) and International Council on Large Electric Systems (CIGRÉ) devised standard thermal modeling of conductors for ampacity calculations. CIGRÉ issued guidelines for DLR.

Deploying DLR entails equipping circuits likely to benefit from significant capacity gains with sensors and using the resulting capacity increases when required and possible. Typical applications include:

- Relaxing congestions due to increasing load
- Improving economic dispatch scenarios in N-1 contingencies
- Integrating renewable/distributed energy sources without grid reinforcement
- Deferring or avoiding uprating of circuits
- Maximizing the use of alternate lines when main corridors are undergoing maintenance
- Maximizing transit on interconnectors and "bottleneck" topologies
- Addressing potential safety/conformance issues
- Connecting wind power to the grid

These subjects are addressed at load dispatch center level, and by planning and maintenance departments. However, to decide on priorities, simulations based on 3D line-profile analysis and weather data are sometimes performed prior to deployment.

There are two categories of DLR computation methods:

- Direct measurement methods use devices that are directly coupled to the line. These devices measure temperature, tension, sag and/or clearance from which the thermal rating is determined.
- Indirect measurement methods use weather stations and modeling.

Direct methods give actual conductor state condition with respect to clearance rules and/or maximum conductor temperature, while indirect methods provide estimates based on prevailing, forecast, or measured weather conditions around the line. Computational fluid dynamics models can be used to provide a larger effective area to a single weather station by mapping wind patterns around the terrain. Direct methods are strongly recommended by CIGRÉ standards 207 and TB 209 TB 498.

Several kinds of ratings are available, depending on input parameters and algorithms. Real-time ratings allow control room engineers to adjust power flows according to normal operational events or contingencies. They are based on "steady-state (equilibrium) ampacity" calculations. Emergency ratings are based on transient equations and models: they provide permissible overload ratings for a short and adjustable time (typically 5 to 30 minutes). Forecasting methods have been developed to determine intraday and day-ahead ampacity forecasts. They combine DLR historical measurements and weather forecasts. These methods are proprietary and are promoted by industry associations like CIGRÉ's Study Committee B2 and the WATT Coalition. While DLR solutions can be implemented stand-alone, they are more commonly integrated with other systems in the control room of the electric utility SCADA (supervisory control and data acquisition). Energy management system or distribution management system vendors may propose this type of integration to enhance their offering.

== History and perspectives ==
Pioneer companies, now defunct, followed initiatives by the US Department of Energy, electric utilities ONCOR, NYPA, ENTSO-E, and the European Commission's Energy Research programme. They contributed in setting the standards for more advanced solutions. The most active manufacturers originate in North America and Europe where market stimulation is strongest. Experiments were conducted to field-test available technologies and to quantify benefits, in terms of available transit gains and capital expenditure savings. Operation expenditure gains are more delicate to evaluate since they depend on grid codes, local regulation rules, incentives and penalties. However they can be classified as "additional transit revenues", "improved economic dispatch" and "avoided penalties".

As of June 2018 around 20 electric utilities in the Americas and Europe use DLR in daily transmission operations. Benefits recorded have attracted the attention of investors, governments and international development aid institutions, who include a DLR share in the scope of their green-field powerline construction projects.

Dynamic line rating has been studied for more than 20 years inside CIGRE and IEEE working groups. But technology (sensors, weather forecast), as well as national or supra national rules, did not allow generation of a financial return for the owners of the line, which is nowadays (2018) possible in many countries. Moreover, the electricity generation mix is strongly changing in many countries due to the large deployment of wind and solar farms. The power flows are therefore changing a lot because of renewables and intercountry exchanges, where potential larger transit (owing to DLR) allows lower market electricity cost. There are large opportunities owing to technology miniaturization (accelerometers, digital signal processing for embedded data treatment, telecommunications, etc.) and new developments in weather forecasts (which are nowadays much more accurate and require less computational power than only a few years ago), including for these last, up to 72 hours ahead. Availability of this equipment and data for a reasonable cost helps to develop new sensors and systems which may be implemented into the EMS (energy management system) of national or local dispatching. These dynamic line rating sensors may sometimes warranty up to 30% more power transit in the monitored lines, depending on wind speed which is actually and locally evaluated by appropriate sensors using intelligent data processing.

Capacity forecasting seems to be the new promise of DLR, mixing on-line sensors with reliable weather data forecast, up to two days ahead. In this field, significant social welfare benefits are expected inasmuch as capacity forecasts favour converging zonal prices and a decrease in congestion rents.

== Computation methods and applicable standards ==
Direct measurement methods use field data measured to inform on line condition (conductor temperature, sagging, clearances) and on weather parameters (ambient temperature, solar radiation, wind velocity). Spans deemed "critical" – likely to reach thermal or clearance limits first – are monitored in real-time, providing data on their status with respect to safety limits. The state change equation of the conductor, using its thermal features (absorptivity, emissivity) converts data on span geometry into valid temperature data for the "ruling span" of the monitored section. If weather conditions are more favorable than those used for the calculation of static limits, a margin probably exists. To be able to provide reliable and safe values, real-time parameters (load current, conductor temperature, weather parameters) are fed into the conductor's thermal model as per IEEE and CIGRÉ guidelines. Measurements, software and specialized algorithms are housed in a dedicated computer system, forming a "DLR server", with communication facilities. After processing and formatting, "ratings" are made available to human operators via a user interface (computer displays and data files). Several kinds of ratings may be made available, including: real-time, indicating ampacity immediately available, without time limits should conditions remain identical; emergency ratings for a limited duration; and same-day and day-ahead forecasts.

DLR computations deal with "near real-time" data, updated about every five minutes. Shorter time cycles would require uneconomical computing power and offer little added value due to the thermal inertia of power transit phenomena. In current applications, DLR involves human-made decisions in control rooms, without automation.

Weather parameters affect line ratings in decreasing order, as follows:

- wind is the most important factor
- ambient temperature
- solar radiation
- rain is generally not taken into account

Standards published by IEEE and CIGRÉ cover the following subjects, necessary to perform DLR:

- on conductors and thermal ratings: thermal behavior of overhead conductors (TB207), rating of overhead conductors (TB299, TB601), thermal modelling of overhead conductors (IEEE738)
- on dynamic line-rating specifically (TB498)

== Integration into control room processes ==
DLR translates into benefits when dispatch engineers apply optimized ratings to transit operations from their national or regional control center. Stand-alone DLR solutions provide real-time data for day-to-day operations and historical data for statistical analysis. The ultimate destination of a DLR solution is integration into control room tools and systems. Typically, the DLR server can be configured to send standard telecontrol frames to the electric utility's SCADA front-end acquisition units. These frames can then be processed for display and calculations by the utility energy management system or distribution management system. Short-term network operation decisions are based on optimized rating information, as well as load-flow calculations and economic dispatch scenarios. The latter also benefit from short-term forecasts in contingency analysis.

== Communications, IT and cybersecurity considerations ==
Input data (weather parameters, circuit load, infrastructure design, field measurements) are public domain, proprietary if not confidential, and must be managed accordingly. Output data (line condition, ratings and forecasts) are proprietary and confidential. To ensure provisions of data confidentiality, integrity and availability, the utility and the vendor implement secured communications with cyphering, access control and restrictions. Industry trends favor deployments in SaaS (software as a service) mode. Sensitive areas are:

- communications between field devices and data concentrator (most likely an IT setup comprising a data server)
- protection of the data and software (firewalls and anti-virus against unwanted access and malware)
- uptime commitments through redundancy strategies.
