= Kiisa =

Borough in Estonia

- Small borough
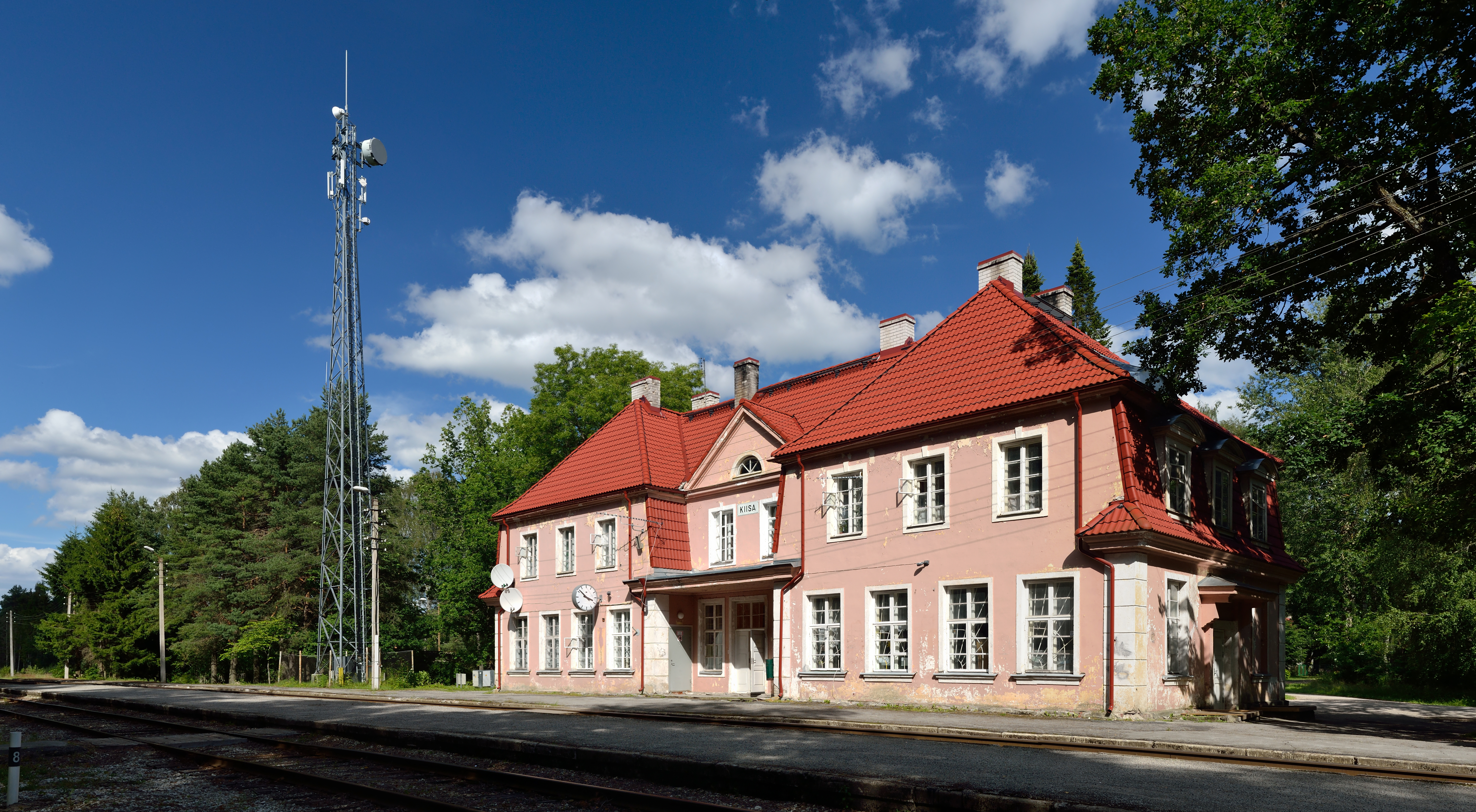
- Station building

- Location in Estonia
- Coordinates: 59°14′14″N 24°41′14″E
- Country: Estonia
- County: Harju County
- Municipality: Saku Parish

Population (2011 Census)
  - Total: 713

Kiisa is a small town (Estonian: alevik) in Saku Parish, Harju County, Estonia. As of the 2011 census, the settlement had a population of 713.

It has a railway station on the Tallinn - Viljandi railway line operated by Elron (rail transit).

Kiisa is the location of a currently under construction Kiisa Emergency Reserve Power Plant.
