= Kiisa Power Plant =

Power station in Estonia

Kiisa Emergency Reserve Power Plant
- Country: Estonia
- Location: Kiisa
- Coordinates: 59°14′38″N 24°42′20″E
- Status: Operational
- Construction began: 2011
- Commission date: November 2013 (1st unit); June 2014
- Construction cost: €135 million
- Owner: Elering
- Operator: Elering

Thermal power station
- Primary fuel: Natural gas
- Secondary fuel: Light fuel oil

Power generation
- Units operational: 1 X 110 MW; 1 X 140 MW
- Make and model: Wärtsilä 20V34DF engines
- Nameplate capacity: 250 MW

The Kiisa Power Plant is an emergency reserve power plant, based on the engine power plant technology, located in Kiisa, Estonia, about 25 kilometres (16 mi) from Tallinn. As an emergency plant, it operates only in the case of a network failure or capacity shortfall, and it does not participate in the everyday electricity market. The power plant is owned and operated by the Estonian transmission system operator Elering.

The plant is supplied by Wärtsilä and it is based on Wärtsilä 20V34DF engines fuelled by natural gas as a primary fuel and light fuel oil as a back-up fuel. It consist of two generation units with capacity of 110 MW and 140 MW accordingly. Each of units is a set of 10-MW generators. Construction started in 2011 and the first unit was commissioned in January 2014 and the second unit was commissioned in July 2014. Its total capacity 250 MW is equal to one sixth of the maximum consumption of Estonia.

The power plant is located next to the Kiisa 110/330 kV substation, which is connected to the Estonia's main transmission lines. As an emergency reserve power plant, it should reach full output within 10 minutes. It will be fully automatic without permanent personnel on site. The plant is connected with the natural gas grid. In addition, it has an oil terminal with tanks' capacity up to 14,000 cubic metres (490,000 cu ft) of diesel.

A 100 MW / 200 MWh grid battery started operating in 2026.

Satellite picture

== See also ==
- Energy in Estonia
