= Volume risk =

Risk that changes in transaction or production volumes will affect financial outcomes

Example

An electricity retailer cannot accurately predict the demand of all households for a given time which is why the producer cannot forecast the precise time that a power plant will provide more electricity that consumed, even if the plant always delivers the same output of energy.

Volume risk, also known as quantity risk, is the risk of production or sales volumes materially and adversely deviating from their expected quantities. The term has context-specific applications.

== Application ==
As regards commodity risk, a major concern is yield risk, which is the uncertainty regarding production fearing insufficient quantities of the respective commodity mined, extracted or otherwise produced. A participant here further faces uncertainty concerning demand, where large deviations from the forecasted volume may be caused, for example, by unseasonal weather impacting gas consumption. Other concerns include plant availability, collective customer outrage, and regulatory interventions. These changes in supply and demand often result in market volatility. Producers here are relatedly subject to price risk, although in a narrower sense than usually employed.

In the context of business risk, volume risk relates primarily to revenue, where deviation from budget may be due to external or internal factors. Internal factors, such as insufficient human capital and plant aging, may negate the business line's ability to execute the operational or business plan. External factors comprise primarily of the competitive landscape. A public–private partnership (PPP), carries what is there referred to as "revenue risk".

== Risk management ==
Risk management entails formally modeling demand and responding dynamically (if not preemptively) to the market. Scenario planning may explicitly incorporate varying levels of demand. For PPPs, a tax-supported minimum revenue guarantee (MRG), may be provided by the (local) government. Regarding production uncertainty, an approach often taken is to diversify spatially; it may also be possible to allow for contingencies in plant availability.

Direct hedging, however, becomes difficult when the quantity is uncertain, particularly where the underlying commodity is not storable. One approach is to hedge against fluctuations in total, i.e. quantity times price. Various strategies have been developed using, for example, weather derivatives and electricity options. At the same time, producers and their customers regularly hedge against price risk using available commodity derivatives. Commodity traders will similarly have hedges in place for the resultant market and volatility risk.

== See also ==
- Customer demand planning
- Commodity market
- Decision tree
- Demand risk
- Energy forecasting
  - Electricity price forecasting
  - Solar power forecasting
  - Wind power forecasting
- Financial forecast
  - Product forecasting
  - Sales forecasting
- Financial risk management § Corporate finance
- Flexible manufacturing system
- FP&A
- Intensity option
- Mineral economics
- Mineral exploration
- Sales variance § Sales volume variance
- Supplier risk management
- Supply chain risk management
- Switching option
- Take-or-pay contract
