= Curtailment (electricity) =

Deliberate reduction in power output

- Process type: Grid operation / Electricity market practice
- Industrial sector(s): Electric power industry
- Main technologies or sub-processes: Grid management systems, renewable energy forecasting

In the electric power industry, curtailment is an intentional reduction of electric generation output ("dispatch down") made to maintain grid stability (for example, in grid balancing). Reducing demand to keep a grid stable is called load shedding. While curtailment is a standard technique that has been applied throughout the history of electric power production, in the 21st century it has become an economic issue for the owners of wind and solar generation plants. These variable renewable energy plants, due to the absence of an expendable resource (like fuel), have quite low marginal electricity production costs, so curtailment affects the economics of projects in a much more significant way than with conventional units.

Curtailment is a loss of potentially useful energy and may impact power purchase agreements. However, using all available energy may require costly methods such as building new power lines or storage, becoming more expensive than letting surplus power go unused.

== Examples ==
After ERCOT built a new transmission line from the Competitive Renewable Energy Zone in West Texas to the central cities in the Texas Interconnection in 2013, curtailment was reduced from 8-16% to near zero.

Curtailment of wind power in western China was around 20% in 2018.

In 2018, curtailment in the California grid was 460 GWh, or 0.2% of generation. Monthly curtailment has since increased to 150-300 GWh in 2020 and 2021 and to 500-700 GWh by 2024/2025, mainly in spring, although 11 GW of batteries also time-shifted some of the surplus power. Curtailments mainly happen for solar power at noon as part of the duck curve.

In Hawaii, curtailment reached 20% on the island of Maui in Hawaii in the second and third quarters of 2020.

In Ireland, 1.2 TWh of wind power was curtailed in 2022. In United Kingdom, 1.35 TWh of wind power was curtailed in early 2023. In Australia, 4.5 TWh of solar and wind power was curtailed in 2024. In the 2 years from October 2022 to September 2024, 2.9% of solar power in Spain was curtailed. Greece curtailed 0.9 TWh in 2024, and 2 TWh of green power in 2025. In 2025 in the Cyprus grid, almost half of distributed large scale solar power was curtailed. In the European Union, nearly 30 TWh of renewable electricity is curtailed each year because of insufficient grid capacity.

Curtailment in Texas, 2007-2014

Monthly curtailment in California 2015-2024

Solar power and curtailment in California, by hour

== Mitigation options ==
Curtailment can be reduced or avoided completely through transmission upgrades, demand response, increased energy storage, and better energy forecasting (including forecasting for price, wind and solar).

== Sources ==
- Bird, Lori; Cochran, Jaquelin; Wang, Xi (March 2014). "Wind and Solar Energy Curtailment: Experience and Practices in the United States" (PDF). NREL.
