= Consensus forecast =

Prediction of the future created by combining several separate forecasts

A consensus forecast is a prediction of the future created by combining several separate forecasts which have often been created using different methodologies. They are used in a number of sciences, ranging from econometrics to meteorology, and are also known as combining forecasts, forecast averaging or model averaging (in econometrics and statistics) and committee machines, ensemble averaging or expert aggregation (in machine learning).

Applications can range from forecasting the weather to predicting the annual gross domestic product of a country or the number of cars a company or an individual dealer is likely to sell in a year. While forecasts are often made for future values of a time series, they can also be for one-off events such as the outcome of a presidential election or a football match.

== Background ==
Forecasting plays a key role in any organisation's planning process as it provides insight into uncertainty. Through simulation, one will be able to assess whether proposed strategies are likely to produce the desired objectives within predefined limits. In the field of economic forecasting, the future path of the economy is intrinsic to almost every company's business outlook, and hence there is considerable demand for accurate economic forecasts. Matching this strong demand is the large volume of readily available forecast information from governments, international agencies and various private firms. Companies such as FocusEconomics and Blue Chip Economic Indicators specialise in publishing economic forecast data, with the former covering most major regions of the world as well as providing forecasts for currencies and commodities, and the latter focusing on the US economy. However, deciphering the best forecast method is no easy task, and largely depends on the objectives of the user and the constraints they are likely to face. Rather than try to identify a single best forecasting method, an alternative approach is to combine the results from independent forecasters and take an average of the forecasts.

This method of taking a simple mean average of a panel of independent forecasts, derived from different forecasting methods, is known as combining forecasts and the result is often referred to as a consensus forecast. Unless a particular forecast model which produces smaller forecast errors compared to other individual forecasts can be identified, adopting the consensus approach can be beneficial due to diversification gains. Combining economic forecasts is well established in many countries and can count central banks, government institutions and businesses among the users. In recent decades, consensus forecasts have attracted much interest, backed by the publication of a huge swathe of academic research on forecast accuracy. Empirical studies show that pooling forecasts increased forecast accuracy. One of the advantages of using consensus forecasts is that it can prove useful if there is a high degree of uncertainty or risk attached to the situation and the selection of the most accurate forecast in advance is difficult. Even if one method is identified as the best, combining is still worthwhile if other methods can make some positive contribution to the forecast accuracy. Moreover, many factors can affect the independent forecast and these, along with any additional useful information, might be captured by using the consensus approach. Another argument in favour of this method is that individual forecasts may be subject to numerous behavioural biases, but these can be minimised by combining independent forecasts together. Hence, combining is seen as helping to improve forecast accuracy by reducing the forecast errors of individual forecasts. Furthermore, averaging forecasts is likely to be more useful when the data and the forecasting techniques that the component forecasts are drawn from differ substantially. And even though it is only a simple approach (typically an unweighted mean average), this method is just as useful as other more sophisticated models. Indeed, more recent studies in the past decade have shown that, over time, the equal weights combined forecast is usually more accurate than the individual forecast which make up the consensus.

In sum, the usefulness of the consensus forecast technique has been supported by a wealth of empirical studies in recent decades. The use of equal weights in the combining method is appealing because of its simplicity and is easy to describe. Among others, this simple method of averaging the forecasts of individual forecasters has been put into practice by many of the world's central banks as they try to gauge expectations in the private sector. An empirical study carried out by Roy Batchelor in 2000 demonstrates greater accuracy in the consensus forecasts over macroeconomic projections produced by leading multinational agencies such as the International Monetary Fund and the Organisation for Economic Co-operation and Development. A study by Robert C. Jones found: "At least since the publication of "The Combination of Forecasts" (Bates and Granger [1969]), economists have known that combining forecasts from different sources can both improve accuracy and reduce forecaster error. In the intervening years, numerous studies have confirmed these conclusions, outlined conditions under which forecast combinations are most effective, and tried to explain why simple equal weights work so well relative to more sophisticated statistical techniques."

== Probabilistic forecasts ==
Although the literature on the combination of point forecasts is very rich, the topic of combining probabilistic forecasts is not so popular. There are very few papers that deal explicitly with the combination of interval forecasts, however, there has been some progress in the area of density forecasts. A simple, yet powerful alternative technique has been introduced in the context of electricity price forecasting. Quantile Regression Averaging (QRA) involves applying quantile regression to the point forecasts of a number of individual forecasting models or experts. It has been found to perform extremely well in practice - the top two performing teams in the price track of the Global Energy Forecasting Competition (GEFCom2014) used variants of QRA.

== See also ==
- Consensus-based assessment
- Consensus decision-making
- Delphi method
- Economic forecasting
- Ensemble averaging
- Ensemble forecasting
- Quantile Regression Averaging (QRA)
- Reference class forecasting
