= QPF =

QPF may refer to:

- Quantitative precipitation forecast
- Quebec Police Force, the Sûreté du Québec
- Queensland Poetry Festival
