= Probabilistic forecasting =

Type of statistical forecasting

Probabilistic forecasting summarizes what is known about, or opinions about, future events. In contrast to single-valued forecasts (such as forecasting that the maximum temperature at a given site on a given day will be 23 degrees Celsius, or that the result in a given football match will be a no-score draw), probabilistic forecasts assign a probability to each of a number of different outcomes, and the complete set of probabilities represents a probability forecast. Thus, probabilistic forecasting is a type of probabilistic classification.

== Applications ==
Weather forecasting represents a service in which probability forecasts are sometimes published for public consumption, although it may also be used by weather forecasters as the basis of a simpler type of forecast. For example, forecasters may combine their own experience together with computer-generated probability forecasts to construct a forecast of the type "we expect heavy rainfall".

Sports betting is another field of application where probabilistic forecasting can play a role. The pre-race odds published for a horse race can be considered to correspond to a summary of bettors' opinions about the likely outcome of a race, although this needs to be tempered with caution as bookmakers' profits need to be taken into account. In sports betting, probability forecasts may not be published as such, but may underlie bookmakers' activities in setting pay-off rates, etc.

=== Weather forecasting ===
Probabilistic forecasting is used in a weather forecasting in a number of ways. One of the simplest is the publication of about rainfall in the form of a probability of precipitation.

==== Ensembles ====
The probability information is typically derived by using several numerical model runs, with slightly varying initial conditions. This technique is usually referred to as ensemble forecasting by an Ensemble Prediction System (EPS). EPS does not produce a full forecast probability distribution over all possible events, and it is possible to use purely statistical or hybrid statistical/numerical methods to do this. For example, temperature can take on a theoretically infinite number of possible values (events); a statistical method would produce a distribution assigning a probability value to every possible temperature. Implausibly high or low temperatures would then have close to zero probability values.

If it were possible to run the model for every possible set of initial conditions, each with an associated probability, then according to how many members (i.e., individual model runs) of the ensemble predict a certain event, one could compute the actual conditional probability of the given event. In practice, forecasters try to guess a small number of perturbations (usually around 20) that they deem are most likely to yield distinct weather outcomes. Two common techniques for this purpose are breeding vectors (BV) and singular vectors (SV). This technique is not guaranteed to yield an ensemble distribution identical to the actual forecast distribution, but attaining such probabilistic information is one goal of the choice of initial perturbations. Other variants of ensemble forecasting systems that have no immediate probabilistic interpretation include those that assemble the forecasts produced by different numerical weather prediction systems.

==== Examples ====
Canada has been one of the first countries to broadcast their probabilistic forecast by giving chances of precipitation in percentages. As an example of fully probabilistic forecasts, recently, distribution forecasts of rainfall amounts by purely statistical methods have been developed whose performance is competitive with hybrid EPS/statistical rainfall forecasts of daily rainfall amounts.

Probabilistic forecasting has also been used in combination with neural networks for energy generation. This is done via improved weather forecasting using probabilistic intervals to account for uncertainties in wind and solar forecasting, as opposed to traditional techniques such as point forecasting.

=== Economic forecasting ===
Macroeconomic forecasting is the process of making predictions about the economy for key variables such as GDP and inflation, amongst others, and is generally presented as point forecasts. One of the problems with point forecasts is that they do not convey forecast uncertainties, and this is where the role of probability forecasting may be helpful. Most forecasters would attach probabilities to a range of alternative outcomes or scenarios outside of their central forecasts. These probabilities provide a broader assessment of the risk attached to their central forecasts and are influenced by unexpected or extreme shifts in key variables.

Prominent examples of probability forecasting are those undertaken in surveys whereby forecasters are asked, in addition to their central forecasts, for their probability estimates within a specified range. The Monetary Authority of Singapore (MAS) is one such organisation which publishes probability forecasts in its quarterly MAS Survey of Professional Forecasters. Another is Consensus Economics, a macroeconomic survey firm, which publishes a special survey on forecast probabilities each January in its Consensus Forecasts, Asia Pacific Consensus Forecasts and Eastern Europe Consensus Forecasts publications.

Besides survey firms covering this subject, probability forecasts are also a topic of academic research. This was discussed in a 2000 research paper by Anthony Garratt, Kevin Lee, M. Hashem Pesaran and Yongcheol Shin entitled 'Forecast Uncertainties in Macroeconometric Modelling: An Application to the UK Economy'. The MAS released an article on the topic in its Macroeconomic Review in October 2015 called A Brief Survey of Density Forecasting in Macroeconomics.

=== Energy forecasting ===
Probabilistic forecasts have not been investigated extensively to date in the context of energy forecasting. However, the situation is changing. While the Global Energy Forecasting Competition (GEFCom) in 2012 was on point forecasting of electric load and wind power, the 2014 edition aimed at probabilistic forecasting of electric load, wind power, solar power and electricity prices. The top two performing teams in the price track of GEFCom2014 used variants of Quantile Regression Averaging (QRA), a new technique which involves applying quantile regression to the point forecasts of a small number of individual forecasting models or experts, hence allows to leverage existing development of point forecasting.

Lumina Decision Systems has created an example probabilistic forecast of energy usage for the next 25 years using the US Department of Energy's Annual Energy Outlook (AEO) 2010.

=== Population forecasting ===
Probability forecasts have also been used in the field of population forecasting.

== Assessment ==
Assessing probabilistic forecasts is more complex than assessing deterministic forecasts. If an ensemble-based approach is being used, the individual ensemble members need first to be combined and expressed in terms of a probability distribution. There exist probabilistic (proper) scoring rules such as the continuous ranked probability score for evaluating probabilistic forecasts. One example of such a rule is the Brier score.

== See also ==
- Consensus forecast
- Energy forecasting
- Forecasting
- Forecast skill
- Global Energy Forecasting Competitions
