= MM5 =

MM5 may refer to:

- MM5 (weather model), a regional mesoscale model for creating weather forecasts and climate projections
- Mega Man 5, a 1992 NES game in the Mega Man video game series
- Mega Man V (Game Boy), a 1994 Game Boy game in the Mega Man video game series
- Might and Magic V: Darkside of Xeen, a 1993 video role-playing game in the Might and Magic series
- MM5 register, a CPU register used by the MMX extension
