= Take-or-pay contract =

Kind of contract

A take-or-pay contract, or a take-or-pay clause within a contract, is a payment obligation agreed between a business customer and its supplier. With this kind of contract, the customer either takes the product from the supplier or pays the supplier a penalty. For any product the company takes, it agrees to pay the supplier a certain price, say $50 per ton. Furthermore, up to an agreed-upon ceiling, the company is required to pay the supplier even for products it does not take. This "penalty" price may be lower, say $40 a ton. Take-or-pay clauses are common in the energy industry and, in particular, for gas sales; see volume risk. The High Court in England and Wales recognises such clauses as "a familiar provision in commercial contracts", but also notes that they have been a source of commercial dispute "for more than 100 years".

== Advantages ==
1. Reduces risk to the company's suppliers, in return for which the company can ask to pay less.
2. Reduces the supplier's rival’s incentive to come after the company's customers by making retaliation a near certainty.

== Disadvantages ==
1. Increases severity of price war if deterrence fails.
2. Increases risk of market foreclosure through a strong barrier for new entrants seeking to join the market — this reduces competition, raises prices for consumers and is likely to lead to a deadweight economic loss for society.

== Case law ==
Outside the oil and gas context, "take or pay" contract terms are often rejected by courts as unenforceable penalties. Courts look at these as "liquidated damages" clauses that must be based on a reasonable approximation of the actual damage that a party would suffer due to the other party's breach. "Take or pay" generally does not meet that standard.

At least within the oil and gas context, however, the courts in the United States tend to construe "take or pay" contracts as providing a means of alternative performance; a gas purchaser can either buy the gas or pay a deficiency amount. In other words, courts find that so long as the purchaser either buys the gas or makes the deficiency payment no breach has occurred and, therefore, there are no liquidated damages because the payment of the deficiency amount is not a remedy but is instead an alternative means of performance. The Oklahoma Supreme Court explained this rationale in Roye Realty & Developing, Inc. v. Arkla, Inc., 1993 OK 99, 863 P.2d 1150. In that case, Arkla, a gas purchaser, argued that the deficiency payment provision in a "take or pay" contract really was a liquidated damages provision. The Oklahoma Supreme Court rejected Arkla's contention, stating:

"Moreover, the deficiency payment is not a liquidated damages provision which sets the amount of damages when Arkla breaches its obligation to take and pay for gas. Because there is a second alternative available for Arkla to perform, failure to take and pay for gas merely constitutes a decision not to perform the first alternative obligation and is not a repudiation of the contract. Repudiation of the contract does not occur until Arkla also refuses to make the required deficiency payments. Hence, the deficiency payment obligation is not a provision designed to provide the measure of damages when Arkla fails to take and pay for gas under the contract."

In the United Kingdom, a take-or-pay clause included in a contract between M&J Polymers and Imerys Minerals was found on its own facts to be "commercially justifiable" in a 2008 High Court ruling, allowing suppliers in certain contexts to maintain "confidence in using take or pay clauses in their supply contracts" so long as they have been freely negotiated by both parties.
