= Electricity pricing =

Electricity transport via high-voltage line

Electricity pricing (also referred to as electricity tariffs or the price of electricity) can vary widely by country or by locality within a country. Electricity prices are dependent on many factors, such as the price of power generation, government taxes or subsidies, CO_{2} taxes, local weather patterns, transmission and distribution infrastructure, and multi-tiered industry regulation. The pricing or tariffs can also differ depending on supply and demand, typically for residential, commercial, and industrial connections.

According to the U.S. Energy Information Administration (EIA), "Electricity prices generally reflect the cost to build, finance, maintain, and operate power plants and the electricity grid." Pricing forecasting is the method by which a generator, a utility company, or a large industrial consumer can predict the wholesale prices of electricity with reasonable accuracy. Due to the complications of electricity generation, the cost to supply electricity varies minute by minute.

Some utility companies are for-profit entities, and their prices include a financial return for owners and investors. These utility companies can exercise their political power within existing legal and regulatory regimes to guarantee a financial return and reduce competition from other sources like a distributed generation.

== Rate structure ==
In standard regulated monopoly markets like the United States, there are multilevel governance structures that set electricity rates. The rates are determined through a regulatory process that is overseen by governmental organizations.

The inclusion of renewable energy distributed generation (DG) and advanced metering infrastructure (AMI or smart meter) in the modern electricity grid has introduced many alternative rate structures. There are several methods that modern utilities structure residential rates:

- Simple (or fixed) – A flat charge per kilowatt-hour (kWh).
- Tiered (or step) – The price per kWh changes with the level of consumption. Rates may increase to encourage conservation or decrease to promote usage.
- Time of use (TOU) – Prices vary according to the time of day.
- Demand rates – Charges are based on a consumer's peak electricity demand.
- Tiered within TOU – Consumption tiers are applied within specific time periods.
- Seasonal rates – Rates vary by season or are applied to properties not used year-round (e.g., cottages).
- Weekend/holiday rates – Different rates apply on weekends or public holidays compared with standard periods.

The simple rate charges a specific dollar per kilowatt hour ($/kWh) consumed. The tiered rate is one of the more common residential rate programs. The tiered rate charges a higher rate as customer usage increases. TOU and demand rates are structured to help maintain and control a utility's peak demand. The concept at its core is to discourage customers from contributing to peak-load times by charging them more money to use power at that time. Historically, rates have been minimal at night because the peak is during the day when all sectors are using electricity. Increased demand requires additional energy generation, which is traditionally provided by less efficient "peaker" plants that cost more to generate electricity than "baseload" plants. However, as greater penetration from renewable energy sources, like solar, is on the grid, the lower cost of electricity is shifted to midday when solar generates the most energy. Time of use (TOU) tariffs can shift electricity consumption out of peak periods, thus helping the grid cope with variable renewable energy.

A feed-in tariff (FIT) is an energy-supply policy that supports the development of renewable power generation. FITs give financial benefits to renewable power producers. In the United States, FIT policies guarantee that eligible renewable generators will have their electricity purchased by their utility. The FIT contract contains a guaranteed period of time (usually 15–20 years) that payments in dollars per kilowatt hour ($/kWh) will be made for the full output of the system.

Net metering is another billing mechanism that supports the development of renewable power generation, specifically, solar power. The mechanism credits solar energy system owners for the electricity their system adds to the grid. Residential customers with rooftop photovoltaic (PV) systems will typically generate more electricity than their home consumes during daylight hours, so net metering is particularly advantageous. During this time where generation is greater than consumption, the home's electricity meter will run backward to provide a credit on the homeowner's electricity bill. The value of solar electricity is less than the retail rate, so net metering customers are actually subsidized by all other customers of the electric utility.

United States: the Federal Energy Regulatory Commission (FERC) oversees the wholesale electricity market along with the interstate transmission of electricity. Public Service Commissions (PSC), which are also known as Public Utilities commission (PUC), regulate utility rates within each state.

== Price comparison by power source ==
The cost of electricity also differs by the power source. The net present value of the unit-cost of electricity over the lifetime of a generating asset is known as the levelized cost of electricity (LCOE). However, LCOE does not account for the system costs, in particular related to the guarantee of grid stability and power quality, which can represent a significant part of the final price of power. LCOE is therefore largely insufficient when comparing the costs of different power sources.

The generating source mix of a particular utility will thus have a substantial effect on its electricity pricing. Electric utilities that have a high percentage of hydroelectricity will tend to have lower prices, while those with a large amount of older coal-fired power plants will have higher electricity prices. Recently the LCOE of solar photovoltaic technology has dropped substantially. In the United States, 70% of current coal-fired power plants run at a higher cost than new renewable energy technologies (excluding hydro) and by 2030 all of them will be uneconomic. In the rest of the world 42% of coal-fired power plants were operating at a loss in 2019.

== Electricity price forecasting ==
Electricity price forecasting (EPF) is a branch of energy forecasting which focuses on using mathematical, statistical and machine learning models to predict electricity prices in the future. Over the last 30 years electricity price forecasts have become a fundamental input to energy companies' decision-making mechanisms at the corporate level.

Since the early 1990s, the process of deregulation and the introduction of competitive electricity markets have been reshaping the landscape of the traditionally monopolistic and government-controlled power sectors. Throughout Europe, North America, Australia and Asia, electricity is now traded under market rules using spot and derivative contracts. However, electricity is a very special commodity: it is economically non-storable and power system stability requires a constant balance between production and consumption. At the same time, electricity demand depends on weather (temperature, wind speed, precipitation, etc.) and the intensity of business and everyday activities (on-peak vs. off-peak hours, weekdays vs. weekends, holidays, etc.). These unique characteristics lead to price dynamics not observed in any other market, exhibiting daily, weekly and often annual seasonality and abrupt, short-lived and generally unanticipated price spikes.

Extreme price volatility, which can be up to two orders of magnitude higher than that of any other commodity or financial asset, has forced market participants to hedge not only volume but also price risk. Price forecasts from a few hours to a few months ahead have become of particular interest to power portfolio managers. A power market company able to forecast the volatile wholesale prices with a reasonable level of accuracy can adjust its bidding strategy and its own production or consumption schedule in order to reduce the risk or maximize the profits in day-ahead trading. A ballpark estimate of savings from a 1% reduction in the mean absolute percentage error (MAPE) of short-term price forecasts is $300,000 per year for a utility with 1GW peak load. With the additional price forecasts, the savings double.

In some markets, electricity price can occasionally be negative.

== Power quality ==
Excessive Total Harmonic Distortions (THD) and low power factor are costly at every level of the electricity market. The impact of THD is difficult to estimate, but it can potentially cause heat, vibrations, malfunctioning and even meltdowns. The power factor is the ratio of real to apparent power in a power system. Drawing more current results in a lower power factor. Larger currents require costlier infrastructure to minimize power loss, so consumers with low power factors get charged a higher electricity rate by their utility. Power quality is typically monitored at the transmission level. A spectrum of compensation devices mitigate bad outcomes, but improvements can be achieved only with real-time correction devices (old style switching type, modern low-speed DSP driven and near real-time). Most modern devices reduce problems, while maintaining return on investment and significant reduction of ground currents. Power quality problems can cause erroneous responses from many kinds of analog and digital equipment.

== See also ==
- Cost of electricity by source
- Demand response
- Electricity billing in the UK
- Electricity meter
- Energy liberalisation
- Electricity market
- Energy economics
- Feed-in tariff
- Fixed bill
- Levelized cost of electricity
- Price controls
- Spark spread
- Stranded costs
