= Probability of precipitation =

Estimated likelihood of precipitation occurring within a specified forecast region

Probability of precipitation (PoP) is a commonly used term referring to the likelihood of precipitation falling in a particular area over a defined period of time, which is commonly a day, half day, or hour.

The PoP measure is meaningless unless it is associated with an interval of time. Forecasts commonly use PoP defined over 12-hour periods (PoP12), though 6-hour periods (PoP6) and other measures are also published. A "daytime" PoP12 means from 6 am to 6 pm.

Probabilities are often calculated by ensemble forecasting and represent the number of simulations that show rain occurred.

PoPs are generally not statistically independent. A good example of an event that has a strongly dependent hour-to-hour PoP is a hurricane. In that case, there may be a 1 in 5 chance of the hurricane hitting a given stretch of coast, but if it does arrive there will be rain for several hours, with the effect that a one-hour PoP for the same region and period would be similar: about 1 in 5. Localized thunderstorms may be less dependent, with the effect that the one-hour PoPs may be somewhat less than the one-day PoP.

== Definitions ==
=== U.S. National Weather Service ===
According to the U.S. National Weather Service (NWS), PoP is the probability of exceedance that more than 0.01 inches (0.25 mm) of precipitation will fall in a single spot, averaged over the forecast area.

The NWS provides hourly forecasts. These forecasts include PoP over a given twelve-hour period (i.e. daytime vs night) which indicate a PoP if the given conditions at the start of the twelve-hour period hold for the next twelve-hours. They also include hour-to-hour forecasts, which is the PoP for that given hour. Because weather events hour to hour may be varyingly independent, hour-to-hour can be very similar to the current or twelve-hour PoP, or it can vary dramatically.

=== Other US forecasters ===
AccuWeather's definition is based on the probability at the forecast area's official rain gauge. There is also a probability of precipitation for every location in the United States for every minute for the next two hours. This is also known as a minute-cast. The Weather Channel's definition may include precipitation amounts below 0.01 inch (0.254 mm) and includes the chance of precipitation 3 hours before or after the forecast period. This latter change was described as less objective and more consumer-centric. The Weather Channel has an observed wet bias – the probability of precipitation is exaggerated in some cases.

=== Environment Canada ===
Environment Canada reports a chance of precipitation (COP) that is defined as "The chance that measurable precipitation (0.2 mm of rain or 0.2 cm of snow) will fall on any random point of the forecast region during the forecast period." The values are rounded to 10% increments, but are never rounded to 50%.

=== UK Met Office ===
The UK's Met Office reports a PoP that is rounded to 5% and is based on a minimum threshold of 0.1 mm of precipitation.

== Alternative expressions ==
The probability of precipitation can also be expressed using descriptive terms instead of numerical values. For instance, the NWS might describe a precipitation forecast with terms such as "slight chance" meaning 20% certainty and "scattered" meaning 30–50% areal coverage. The precise meaning of these terms varies.

The UK's Met Office replaced descriptive terms, such as "likely", with percentage chance of precipitation in November 2011.

== Public understanding ==
Probability of precipitation may be widely misunderstood by the general public.

The Plain English Campaign objected to the Met Office's use of the phrase "probability of precipitation" in 2011. The Met Office explained that the proposed alternative, "chance of rain", would not describe all the forms of precipitation included in the forecast.

== See also ==
- Quantitative precipitation forecast
