= Quantitative precipitation forecast =

Expected amount of melted precipitation

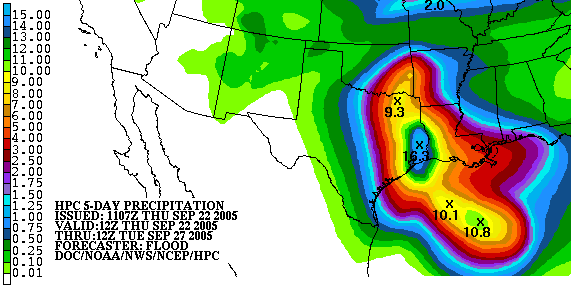
Example of a five-day rainfall forecast from the Hydrometeorological Prediction Center

The quantitative precipitation forecast (abbreviated QPF) is the expected amount of melted precipitation accumulated over a specified time period over a specified area. Terrain is considered in QPFs by use of topography or based upon climatological precipitation patterns from observations with fine detail. Starting in the mid-to-late 1990s, QPFs were used within hydrologic forecast models to simulate impact to rivers throughout the United States. Forecast models show significant sensitivity to humidity levels within the planetary boundary layer, or in the lowest levels of the atmosphere, which decreases with height. QPF can be generated on a quantitative basis, forecasting amounts, or a qualitative basis, forecasting the probability of a specific amount. Radar imagery forecasting techniques show higher skill than model forecasts within 6 to 7 hours of the time of the radar image. The forecasts can be verified through use of rain gauge measurements, weather radar estimates, or a combination of both. Various skill scores can be determined to measure the value of the rainfall forecast.

== Use of radar ==
Algorithms exist to forecast rainfall based on short term radar trends, within a matter of hours. Radar imagery forecasting techniques show higher skill than model forecasts within 6 to 7 hours of the time of the radar image.

== Use of forecast models ==
In the past, the forecaster was responsible for generating the entire weather forecast based upon available observations. Today, meteorologists' input is generally confined to choosing a model based on various parameters, such as model biases and performance. Using a consensus of forecast models, as well as ensemble members of the various models, can help reduce forecast error. However, regardless how small the average error becomes with any individual system, large errors within any particularly piece of guidance are still possible on any given model run. Professionals are required to interpret the model data into weather forecasts that are understandable to the lay person. Professionals can use knowledge of local effects which may be too small in size to be resolved by the model to add information to the forecast. As an example, terrain is considered in the QPF process by using topography or climatological precipitation patterns from observations with fine detail. Using model guidance and comparing the various forecast fields to climatology, extreme events such as excessive precipitation associated with later flood events lead to better forecasts. While increasing accuracy of forecast models implies that humans may no longer be needed in the forecast process at some point in the future, there is currently still a need for human intervention.

=== Nowcasting ===
The forecasting of the precipitation within the next six hours is often referred to as nowcasting. In this time range it is possible to forecast smaller features such as individual showers and thunderstorms with reasonable accuracy, as well as other features too small to be resolved by a computer model. A human given the latest radar, satellite and observational data will be able to make a better analysis of the small scale features present and so will be able to make a more accurate forecast for the following few hours. However, there are now expert systems using those data and mesoscale numerical models to make better extrapolation, including evolution of those features in time.

=== Ensemble forecasting ===
The detail that can be given in a forecast increases with time as errors decrease. There comes a point when the errors are so large that the forecast has no correlation with the actual state of the atmosphere. Looking at a single forecast model does not indicate how likely that forecast is to be correct. Ensemble forecasting entails the production of many forecasts to reflect the uncertainty in the initial state of the atmosphere (due to errors in the observations and insufficient sampling). The range of different forecasts produced can then assess the uncertainty in the forecast. Ensemble forecasts are increasingly being used for operational weather forecasting (for example at European Centre for Medium-Range Weather Forecasts (ECMWF), National Centers for Environmental Prediction (NCEP), and the Canadian Forecasting Center). Ensemble mean forecasts for precipitation have the same problems associated with their use in other fields, as they average out more extreme values, and therefore have limited usefulness for extreme events. In the case of the SREF ensemble mean, used within the United States, this decreasing usefulness starts with values as low as 0.50 inches (13 mm).

== Probability approach ==
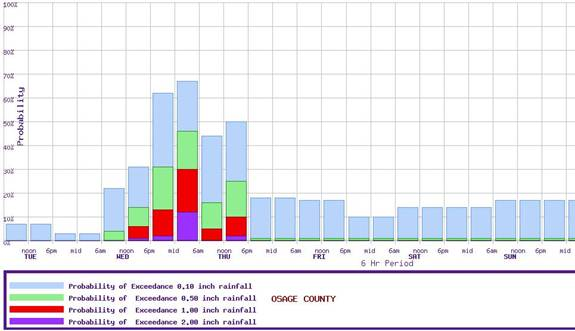
Table showing probabilities of certain rainfall amounts in various blocks of time

In addition to graphical rainfall forecasts showing quantitative amounts, rainfall forecasts can be made describing the probabilities of certain rainfall amounts being met. This allows the forecaster to assign the degree of uncertainty to the forecast. This technique is considered to be informative, relative to climatology. This method has been used for years within National Weather Service forecasts, as a period's chance of rain equals the chance that 0.01 inches (0.25 mm) will fall in any particular spot. In this case, it is known as probability of precipitation. These probabilities can be derived from a deterministic forecast using computer post-processing.

== Entities which generate rainfall forecasts ==
=== Australia ===
The Bureau of Meteorology began a method of forecasting rainfall using a combination, or ensemble, of different forecast models in 2006. It is termed The Poor Man's Ensemble (PME). Its forecasts are more accurate over time than any of the individual models composing the ensemble. The PME is quick to produce, and is available through their Water and the Land page on their website.

=== Hong Kong ===
The Hong Kong Observatory generates short term rainstorm warnings for systems which are expected to accumulate a certain amount of rainfall per hour over the next few hours. They use three levels of warning. The amber warning indicates that a rainfall intensity of 30 millimetres (1.2 in) per hour is expected. The red warning indicates rainfall amounts of 50 millimetres (2.0 in) per hour are anticipated. The black warning indicates that rainfall rates of 70 millimetres (2.8 in) are possible.

=== United States ===
Within the United States, the Hydrometeorological Prediction Center, River Forecast Centers, and local forecast offices within the National Weather Service create precipitation forecasts for up to five days in the future, forecasting amounts equal to or greater than 0.01 inches (0.25 mm). Starting in the mid-to-late 1990s, QPFs were used within hydrologic forecast models to simulate impact of rainfall on river stages.

== Verification ==
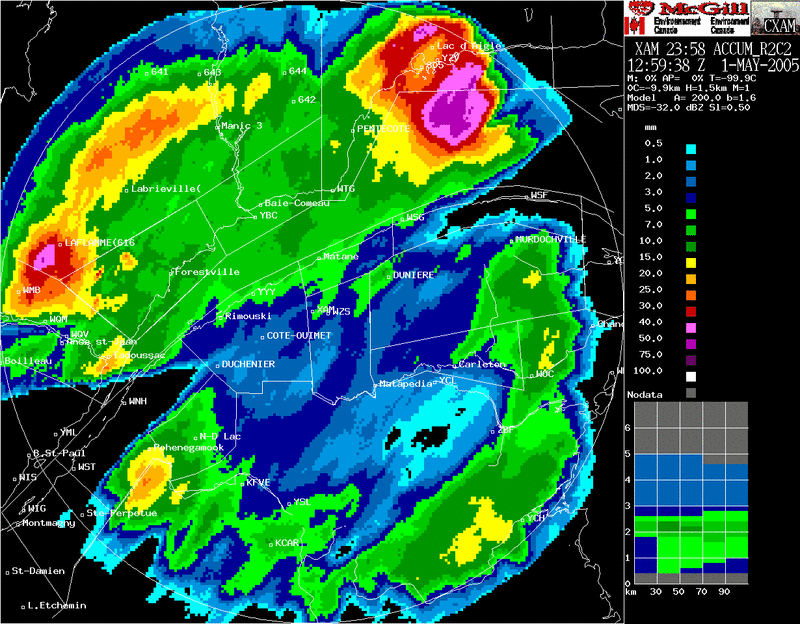
24 hours rain accumulation on the Val d'Irène radar in Eastern Canada. Notice the zones without data in the East and Southwest caused by radar beam blocking from mountains. (Source: Environment Canada)

Rainfall forecasts can be verified a number of ways. Rain gauge observations can be gridded into areal averages, which are then compared to the grids for the forecast models. Weather radar estimates can be used outright, or corrected for rain gauge observations.

Several statistical scores can be based on the observed and forecast fields. One, known as a bias, compares the size of the forecast field to the observed field, with the goal of a score of 1. The threat score involves the intersection of the forecast and observed sets, with a maximum possible verification score of 1. The probability of detection, or POD, is found by dividing the overlap between the forecast and observed fields by the size of the observed field: the goal here is a score of 1. The critical success index, or CSI, divides the overlap between the forecast and observed fields by the combined size of the forecast and observed fields: the goal here is a score of 1. The false alarm rate, or FAR, divides the area of the forecast which does not overlap the observed field by the size of the forecasted area. The goal value in this measure is zero.

With tropical cyclones which impact the United States, the GFS global forecast model performed best in regards to its rainfall forecasts over the last few years, outperforming the NAM and ECMWF forecast models.

== See also ==
- Tropical cyclone rainfall forecasting
- European Flood Alert System: using QPF and EPS for flood forecasting
