= Wet bias =

Weather forecast phenomenon

Wet bias is the phenomenon whereby some weather forecasters report an overestimated and exaggerated probability of precipitation to increase the usefulness and actionability of their forecast. The Weather Channel has been empirically shown, and has also admitted to, having a wet bias in the case of low probability of precipitation (for instance, a 5% probability may be reported as a 20% probability) but not at high probabilities of precipitation (so a 60% probability will be reported as a 60% probability). Some local television stations have been shown as having significantly greater wet bias, often reporting a 100% probability of precipitation in cases where it rains only 70% of the time.

== Discovery ==
In 2002, Eric Floehr, a computer science graduate of the Ohio State University, started collecting historical data of weather forecasts made by the National Weather Service (NWS), The Weather Channel (TWC), and AccuWeather for the United States, and collected the data on ForecastWatch.com. Floehr found that the commercial forecasts were biased: they consistently predicted a higher probability of precipitation than actually occurred. The NWS forecasts were unbiased, whereas those at The Weather Channel were biased for low probabilities of precipitation: when TWC predicted a 20% probability of precipitation, it had historically rained only 5% of the time, but a 70% probability of precipitation corresponded with the real rate of precipitation. Blogger Dan Allan noted that The Weather Channel is also biased at the upper end: a probability of 90% or higher will be rounded up to 100%. On the other hand, local television stations tended to exaggerate the probability of precipitation throughout (except when they forecast a probability of 0%, in which case it still rained about 10% of the time). The findings on wet bias, though informally well known within the weather forecasting community for some time, were first popularized outside the weather forecasting community in Nate Silver's 2012 book The Signal and the Noise.

The term wet bias is used because this is a systematic bias in the direction of the weather being wetter than it actually is.

== Reasons for wet bias ==
According to Silver, The Weather Channel has openly admitted to deliberately exaggerating the probability of precipitation when it is low. This is because of biased incentives: if the correct low probability of precipitation is given, viewers may interpret the forecast as if there were no probability of rain, and then be upset if it does rain. In other words, The Weather Channel compensates for inaccurate perceptions of probabilities. Silver quotes Dr. Rose of The Weather Channel as saying, "If the forecast was objective, if it has zero bias in precipitation, we are in trouble."
