= Wind power forecasting =

Estimate of the expected production of one or more wind turbines

A wind power forecast corresponds to an estimate of the expected production of one or more wind turbines (referred to as a wind farm) in the near future, up to a year. Forecast are usually expressed in terms of the available power of the wind farm, occasionally in units of energy, indicating the power production potential over a time interval.

== Time scales of forecasts ==
Forecasting of the wind power generation may be considered at different time scales, depending on the intended application:

- very short-term forecasts (from seconds up to minutes) are used for the real-time turbine control and electrical grid management, as well as for market clearing;
- short-term forecasts (from 30 minutes up to hours) are used for dispatch planning, intelligent load shedding decisions;
- medium-term forecasts (from 6 hours up to a day) are used for to make decisions for switching the turbine on or off for safety or conditions on the market;
- long-term forecasts (from a day up to a week or even a year) are used for long term planning (to schedule the maintenance or unit commitment, optimize the cost of operation). Maintenance of offshore wind farms may be particularly costly, so optimal planning of maintenance operations is of particular importance.

For the last two possibilities, the temporal resolution of wind power predictions ranges between 10 minutes and a few hours (depending on the forecast length). Improvements of wind power forecasting has focused on using more data as input to the models involved, and on providing uncertainty estimates along with the traditionally provided predictions.

== Reason for wind power forecasts ==
In the electricity grid at any moment balance must be maintained between electricity consumption and generation – otherwise disturbances in power quality or supply may occur. Wind generation is a direct function of wind speed and, in contrast to conventional generation systems, is not easily dispatchable, so fluctuations of wind generation require power substitution from other sources that might not be available on a short notice (it takes 6 hours to fire up a coal plant and 12 hours for a nuclear one). The problem gets more complex once the wind power starts providing more than a small percentage of the overall electricity supplied to the grid. Better forecasts allow utilities to deploy less spinning reserves, usually natural gas-based generators.

The forecasts are typically requested by utilities on two separate time scales:

1. short-term (minutes to 6 hours) forecast is used to adjust the spinning reserves;
2. long-term (day to week) forecast is used by the utility to plan the energy mix or buy electricity from other providers. Typically this information is needed on a "day ahead" basis (e. g., by 6AM), but markets tend not to operate on weekends and holidays, so occasionally longer forecasts are used.

The challenges utilities face when wind generation is injected into a power system depend on the share of that renewable energy and how well connected the grid is. Wind power in Denmark meets almost half of the country's electricity demand, while the instantaneous penetration (that is, the instantaneous wind power production compared to the consumption to be met at a given time) is sometimes above 100%. Unlike some windy parts of the US, which lack sufficient grid capacity, this is easily exported.

The transmission system operator (TSO) is responsible for managing the electricity balance on the grid: at any time, electricity production has to match consumption. Therefore, the use of production means is scheduled in advance in order to respond to load profiles. The load corresponds to the total electricity consumption over the area of interest. Load profiles are usually given by load forecasts which are of high accuracy. For making up the daily schedule, TSOs may consider their own power production means, if they have any, and/or they can purchase power generation from Independent Power Producers (IPPs) and utilities, via bilateral contracts or electricity pools. In the context of deregulation, more and more players appear on the market, thus breaking the traditional situation of vertically integrated utilities with quasi local monopolies. Two main mechanisms compose electricity markets. The first one is the spot market where participants propose quantities of energy for the following day at a given production cost. An auction system permits to settle the electricity spot price for the various periods depending on the different bids. The second mechanism is the balancing of power generation, which is coordinated by the TSO. Depending on the energy lacks and surplus (e.g. due to power plant failures or to intermittence in the case of wind power installations), the TSO determines the penalties that will be paid by IPPs who missed in their obligations. In some cases, an intra-day market is also present, in order to take corrective actions.

In order to illustrate this electricity market mechanism, consider the Dutch electricity market. Market participants, referred to as Program Responsible Parties (PRPs), submit their price-quantity bids before 11 am for the delivery period covering the following day from midnight to midnight. The Program Time Unit (PTU) on the balancing market is of 15 minutes. Balancing of the 15-minute averaged power is required from all electrical producers and consumers connected to the grid, who for this purpose may be organised in sub-sets. Since these sub-sets are referred to as Programmes, balancing on the 15-minute scale is referred to as Programme Balance. Programme Balance now is maintained by using the production schedules issued the day before delivery and measurement reports (distributed the day after delivery). When the measured power is not equal to the scheduled power, the Programme Imbalance is the difference between the realised sum of production and consumption and the forecast sum of production and consumption. If only production from wind energy is taken into account, Programme Imbalance reduces to realised wind production minus forecast wind production. The programme imbalance is the wind production forecast error.

Programme Imbalance is settled by the System Operator, with different tariffs for negative Programme Imbalance and positive Programme Imbalance. A positive Programme Imbalance indicates more energy actually produced than forecast. by wind energy the realised wind production is bigger than the forecast wind production. And vice versa, in the case of a negative Programme Imbalance by wind energy.

Note that the costs for positive and negative imbalances may be asymmetric, depending on the balancing market mechanism. In general, wind power producers are penalized by such market system since a great part of their production may be subject to penalties.

In parallel to be used for market participation, wind power forecasts may be used for the optimal combined operation of wind and conventional generation, wind and hydro-power generation, or wind in combination with some energy storage devices. They also serve as a basis for quantifying the reserve needs for compensating the eventual lacks of wind production.

== General methodology ==
Several techniques of varying degrees of sophistication are used for short-term prediction of wind generation:

- persistence method is naïve: it assumes that the wind power in the next time interval will stay the same as the current measured instantaneous power. Forecast efficiency naturally quickly deteriorates with time going forward, and typically this method is used as a base-level set of numbers for the predictions of other methods to be compared against;
- physical methods that use the numerical weather prediction results, recalculate them into the wind speed at the generation site utilizing the physical characteristics of the area around the wind farm and convert the speed to power predictions using the turbine power curve;
- statistical methods are based on models that assume linear or nonlinear relationship between the numerical weather prediction results and the wind power, with the coefficients trained using the historical data. Two broad subclasses of the statistical models are:
  - time series;
  - ANNs;
- hybrid methods.

Advanced approaches for short-term wind power forecasting necessitate predictions of meteorological variables as input. Then, they differ in the way predictions of meteorological variables are converted to predictions of wind power production, through the so-called power curve. Such advanced methods are traditionally divided into two groups. The first group, referred to as physical approach, focuses on the description of the wind flow around and inside the wind farm, and use the manufacturer's power curve, for proposing an estimation of the wind power output. In parallel the second group, referred to as statistical approach, concentrates on capturing the relation between meteorological predictions (and possibly historical measurements) and power output through statistical models whose parameters have to be estimated from data, without making any assumption on the physical phenomena.

== Prediction of meteorological variables ==
Wind power generation is directly linked to weather conditions and thus the first aspect of wind power forecasting is the prediction of future values of the necessary weather variables at the level of the wind farm. This is done by using numerical weather prediction (NWP) models. Such models are based on equations governing the motions and forces affecting motion of fluids. From the knowledge of the actual state of the atmosphere, the system of equations allows one to estimate what the evolution of state variables, e.g. temperature, velocity, humidity and pressure, will be at a series of grid points. The meteorological variables that are needed as input for wind power prediction obviously include wind speed and direction, but also possibly temperature, pressure and humidity. The distance between grid points is called the spatial resolution of the NWPs. The mesh typically has spacing that varies between few kilometers and up to 50 kilometers for mesoscale models. Regarding the time axis, the forecast length of most of the operational models today is between 48 and 172 hours ahead, which is in adequacy with the requirements for the wind power application. The temporal resolution is usually between 1 and 3 hours. NWP models impose their temporal resolution to short-term wind power forecasting methods since they are used as a direct input.

Predictions of meteorological variables are provided by meteorological institutes. Meteorologists employ atmospheric models for weather forecasts on short and medium term periods. An atmospheric model is a numerical approximation of the physical description of the state of the atmosphere in the near future, and usually is run on a supercomputer. Each computation starts with initial conditions originating from recent measurements. The output consists of the expected instantaneous value of physical quantities at various vertical levels in a horizontal grid and stepping in time up to several hours after initiation. There are several reasons why atmospheric models only approximate reality. First of all, not all relevant atmospheric processes are included in the model. Also, the initial conditions may contain errors (which in a worse case propagate), and the output is only available for discrete points in space (horizontal as well as vertical) and time. Finally, the initial conditions age with time – they are already old when the computation starts let alone when the output is published. Predictions of meteorological variables are issued several times per day (commonly between 2 and 4 times per day), and are available few hours after the beginning of the forecast period. This is because some time is needed for acquiring and analyzing the wealth of measurements used as input to NWP models, then run the model and check and distribute the output forecast series. This gap is a blind spot in the forecasts from an atmospheric model. As an example in the Netherlands, KNMI publishes 4 times per day expected values of wind speed, wind direction, temperature and pressure for the period the between 0 and 48 hours after initialization of the atmospheric model Hirlam with measured data, and then the period before forecast delivery is of 4 hours.

Many different atmospheric models are available, ranging from academic research tools to fully operational instruments. Besides for the very nature of the model (physical processes or numerical schemes) there are some clear distinctive differences between them: time domain (from several hours to 6 days ahead), area (several 10.000 km^{2} to an area covering half the planet), horizontal resolution (1 km to 100 km) and temporal resolution (1 hour to several hours).

One of the atmospheric models is the High Resolution Limited Area Model, abbreviated HIRLAM, which is frequently used in Europe. HIRLAM comes in many versions; that is why it is better to speak about "a" HIRLAM rather than "the" HIRLAM. Each version is maintained by a national institute such as the Dutch KNMI, the Danish DMI or Finnish FMI. And each institute has several versions under her wing, divided into categories such as: operational, pre-operational, semi operational and for research purposes.

Other atmospheric models are

- UM in the UK, run by Met Office,
- COSMO and ICON in Germany, run by DWD,
- ALADIN in France, run by Météo-France,
- and GFS in the US, run by NCEP.

Note that ALADIN and COSMO are also used by other countries within Europe, while UM has been used by BOM in Australia.

== Physical approach to wind power forecasting ==
Meteorological forecasts are given at specific nodes of a grid covering an area. Since wind farms are not situated on these nodes, it is then needed to extrapolate these forecasts at the desired location and at turbine hub height. Physical-based forecasting methods consist of several sub-models which altogether deliver the translation from the wind forecast at a certain grid point and model level, to power forecast at the site considered. Every sub-model contains the mathematical description of the physical processes relevant to the translation. Knowledge of all relevant processes is therefore crucial when developing a purely physical prediction method (such as the early versions of the Danish Prediktor). The core idea of physical approaches is to refine the NWPs by using physical considerations about the terrain such as the roughness, orography and obstacles, and by modeling the local wind profile possibly accounting for atmospheric stability. The two main alternatives to do so are: (i) to combine the modeling of the wind profile (with a logarithmic assumption in most of the cases) and the geostrophic drag law for obtaining surface winds; (ii) to use a CFD (Computational Fluid Dynamics) code that allows one to accurately compute the wind field that the farm will see, considering a full description of the terrain.

When the wind at the level of the wind farm and at hub height is known, the second step consists in converting wind speed to power. Usually, that task is carried out with theoretical power curves provided by the wind turbine manufacturer. However, since several studies have shown the interest of using empirically derived power curve instead of theoretical ones, theoretical power curves are less and less considered. When applying a physical methodology, the modeling of the function which gives the wind generation from NWPs at given locations around the wind farm is done once for all. Then, the estimated transfer function is consequently applied to the available weather predictions at a given moment. In order to account for systematic forecasting errors that may be due to the NWP model or to their modeling approach, physical modelers often integrate Model Output Statistics (MOS) for post-processing power forecasts.

== Statistical approach to wind power forecasting ==
Statistical prediction methods are based on one or several models that establish the relation between historical values of power, as well as historical and forecast values of meteorological variables, and wind power measurements. The physical phenomena are not decomposed and accounted for, even if expertise of the problem is crucial for choosing the right meteorological variables and designing suitable models. Model parameters are estimated from a set of past available data, and they are regularly updated during online operation by accounting for any newly available information (i.e. meteorological forecasts and power measurements).

Statistical models include linear and non-linear models, but also structural and black-box types of models. Structural models rely on the analyst's expertise on the phenomenon of interest while black-box models require little subject-matter knowledge and are constructed from data in a fairly mechanical way. Concerning wind power forecasting, structural models would be those that include a modeling of the diurnal wind speed variations, or an explicit function of meteorological variable predictions. Black-box models include most of the artificial-intelligence-based models such as Neural-Networks (NNs) and Support Vector Machines (SVMs). However, some models are 'in-between' the two extremes of being completely black-box or structural. This is the case of expert systems, which learn from experience (from a dataset), and for which prior knowledge can be injected. We then talk about grey-box modeling. Statistical models are usually composed by an autoregressive part, for seizing the persistent behavior of the wind, and by a 'meteorological' part, which consists in the nonlinear transformation of meteorological variable forecasts. The autoregressive part permits to significantly enhance forecast accuracy for horizons up to 6–10 hours ahead, i.e. over a period during which the sole use of meteorological forecast information may not be sufficient for outperforming persistence.

Today, major developments of statistical approaches to wind power prediction concentrate on the use of multiple meteorological forecasts (from different meteorological offices) as input and forecast combination, as well as on the optimal use of spatially distributed measurement data for prediction error correction, or alternatively for issuing warnings on potentially large uncertainty.

Google's DeepMind uses neural network to improve forecasting.

== Uncertainty of wind power forecasts ==
External image
- Tomorrow's prognosis for three system areas; Denmark West and East, and Estonia

Current designs are optimal only for nonturbulent, steady conditions. Design tools accounting for unsteadiness and turbulence are far less developed.

Predictions of wind power output are traditionally provided in the form of point forecasts, i.e. a single value for each look-ahead time, which corresponds to the expectation or most-likely outcome. They have the advantage of being easily understandable because this single value is expected to tell everything about future power generation. Today, a major part of the research efforts on wind power forecasting still focuses on point prediction only, with the aim of assimilating more and more observations in the models or refining the resolution of physical models for better representing wind fields at the very local scale for instance. These efforts may lead to a significant decrease of the level of prediction error.

However, even by better understanding and modeling both the meteorological and power conversion processes, there will always be an inherent and irreducible uncertainty in every prediction. This epistemic uncertainty corresponds to the incomplete knowledge one has of the processes that influence future events. Therefore, in complement to point forecasts of wind generation for the coming hours or days, of major importance is to provide means for assessing online the accuracy of these predictions. In practice today, uncertainty is expressed in the form of probabilistic forecasts or with risk indices provided along with the traditional point predictions. It has been shown that some decisions related to wind power management and trading are superior when accounting for prediction uncertainty. For the example of the trading application, studies have shown that reliable estimation of prediction uncertainty allows wind power producer to significantly increase their income in comparison to the sole use of an advanced point forecasting method. Other studies of this type deal with optimal dynamic quantification of reserve requirements, optimal operation of combined systems including wind, or multi-area multi-stage regulation. More and more research efforts are expected on prediction uncertainty and related topics.

There are a number of questions that have still yet to be answered, according to a report from a coalition of researchers from universities, industry, and government, supported by the Atkinson Center for a Sustainable Future at Cornell University. They include:

- How do wind farms with their multiple wakes interact with the atmospheric boundary layer to determine the net power that can be produced?
- How do uneven terrain, roughness of the land or sea surface, and turbulence above the boundary layer and turbine wakes affect unsteady loading of downstream wind turbine blades?
- What is the effect of the atmospheric stability (convective, neutral, or stably stratified) on the performance and loading characteristics throughout a typical daily cycle?
- What is the optimal placement of wind turbines in an array, so that the kinetic energy capture can be maximized and unsteady loading be minimized?

The report also provides possible tools used to support this necessary research.

== Accuracy ==
The correlation between wind output and prediction can be relatively high, with an average uncorrected error of 8.8% in Germany over a two-year period.

== See also ==
- Energy forecasting
- Global Energy Forecasting Competition has a track for wind power forecasting
