= Solar power forecasting =

Power forecasting

Solar power forecasting is the process of gathering and analyzing data in order to predict solar power generation on various time horizons with the goal to mitigate the impact of solar intermittency. Solar power forecasts are used for efficient management of the electric grid and for power trading.

As major barriers to solar energy implementation, such as materials cost and low conversion efficiency, continue to fall, issues of intermittency and reliability have come to the fore. The intermittency issue has been successfully addressed and mitigated by solar forecasting in many cases.

Information used for the solar power forecast usually includes the Sun´s path, the atmospheric conditions, the scattering of light and the characteristics of the solar energy plant.

Generally, the solar forecasting techniques depend on the forecasting horizon

- Nowcasting (forecasting 3–4 hours ahead),
- Short-term forecasting (up to seven days ahead) and
- Long-term forecasting (weeks, months, years)

Many solar resource forecasting methodologies were proposed since the 1970 and most authors agree that different forecast horizons require different methodologies. Forecast horizons below 1 hour typically require ground based sky imagery and sophisticated time series and machine learning models. Intra-day horizons, normally forecasting irradiance values up to 4 or 6 hours ahead, require satellite images and irradiance models. Forecast horizons exceeding 6 hours usually rely on outputs from numerical weather prediction (NWP) models.

== Nowcasting ==
Solar power nowcasting refers to the prediction of solar power output over time horizons of tens to hundreds of minutes ahead of time with up to 90% predictability. Solar power nowcasting services are usually related to temporal resolutions of 5 to 15 minutes, with updates as frequent as every minute.

The high resolution required for accurate nowcast techniques require high resolution data input including ground imagery, as well as fast data acquisition form irradiance sensors and fast processing speeds.

The actual nowcast is then frequently enhanced by e.g. statistical techniques. In the case of nowcasting, these techniques are usually based on time series processing of measurement data, including meteorological observations and power output measurements from a solar power facility. What then follows is the creation of a training dataset to tune the parameters of a model, before evaluation of model performance against a separate testing dataset. This class of techniques includes the use of any kind of statistical approach, such as autoregressive moving averages (ARMA, ARIMA, etc.), as well as machine learning techniques such as neural networks, support vector machines (etc.).

An important element of nowcasting solar power are ground based sky observations and basically all intra-day forecasts.

== Short-term solar power forecasting ==
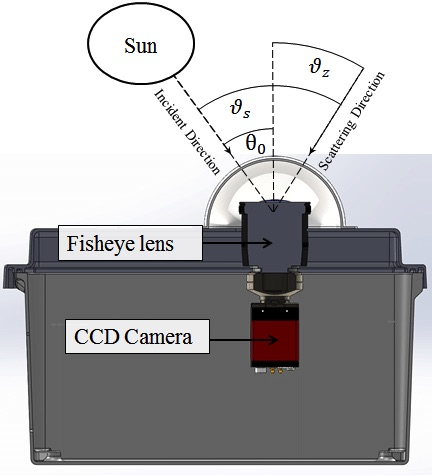
An example of sky-imager used for detecting, tracking and predicting cloud cover conditions in the vicinity of a solar energy facility of interest. Most often, these devices are used to make estimates of solar irradiance from the images using local calibration by a pyranometer. The solar irradiance short-term forecasts are then fed into PV power modelling routines to generate a solar power forecast. Credit: UC San Diego

Short-term forecasting provides predictions up to seven days ahead. Due to the power market regulation in many jurisdictions, intra-day forecasts and day-ahead solar power forecasts are the most important time horizons in this category. Basically all highly accurate short term forecasting methods leverage several data input streams such as meteorological variables, local weather phenomena and ground observations along with complex mathematical models.

=== Ground based sky observations ===
For intra-day forecasts, local cloud information is acquired by one or several ground-based sky imagers at high frequency (1 minute or less). The combination of these images and local weather measurement information are processed to simulate cloud motion vectors and optical depth to obtain forecasts up to 30 minutes ahead.

=== Satellite based methods ===
These methods leverage the several geostationary Earth observing weather satellites (such as Meteosat Second Generation (MSG) fleet) to detect, characterise, track and predict the future locations of cloud cover. These satellites make it possible to generate solar power forecasts over broad regions through the application of image processing and forecasting algorithms. Some satellite based forecasting algorithms include cloud motion vectors (CMVs) or streamline based approaches.

=== Numerical weather prediction ===
Most of the short term forecast approaches use numerical weather prediction models (NWP) that provide an important estimation of the development of weather variables. The models used included the Global Forecast System (GFS) or data provided by the European Center for Medium Range Weather Forecasting (ECMWF). These two models are considered the state of the art of global forecast models, which provide meteorological forecasts all over the world.

In order to increase spatial and temporal resolution of these models, other models have been developed which are generally called mesoscale models. Among others, HIRLAM, WRF or MM5. Since these NWP models are highly complex and difficult to run on local computers, these variables are usually considered as exogeneous inputs to solar irradiance models and ingested form the respective data provider. Best forecasting results are achieved with data assimilation.

Some researchers argue for the use of post-processing techniques, once the models’ output is obtained, in order to obtain a probabilistic point of view of the accuracy of the output. This is usually done with ensemble techniques that mix different outputs of different models perturbed in strategic meteorological values and finally provide a better estimate of those variables and a degree of uncertainty, like in the model proposed by Bacher et al. (2009).

== Long-term solar power forecasting ==
Long-term forecasting usually refers to forecasting techniques applied to time horizons on the order of weeks to years. These time horizons can be relevant for energy producers to negotiate contracts with financial entities or utilities that distribute the generated energy.

In general, these long-term forecasting horizons usually rely on NWP and climatological models. Additionally, most of the forecasting methods are based on mesoscale models fed with reanalysis data as input. Output can also be postprocessed with statistical approaches based on measured data. Due to the fact that this time horizon is less relevant from an operational perspective and much harder to model and validate, only about 5% of solar forecasting publications consider this horizon.

== Energetic models ==
Any output from a model must then be converted to the electric energy that a particular solar PV plant will produce. This step is usually done with statistical approaches that try to correlate the amount of available resource with the metered power output. The main advantage of these methods is that the meteorological prediction error, which is the main component of the global error, might be reduced taking into account the uncertainty of the prediction.

As it was mentioned before and detailed in Heinemann et al., these statistical approaches comprises from ARMA models, neural networks, support vector machines, etc. On the other hand, there also exist theoretical models that describe how a power plant converts the meteorological resource into electric energy, as described in Alonso et al. The main advantage of this type of models is that when they are fitted, they are really accurate, although they are too sensitive to the meteorological prediction error, which is usually amplified by these models. Hybrid models, finally, are a combination of these two models and they seem to be a promising approach that can outperform each of them individually.

== See also ==
- Energy forecasting
