= Global Energy Forecasting Competition =

The Global Energy Forecasting Competition (GEFCom) is a competition conducted by a team led by Dr. Tao Hong that invites submissions around the world for forecasting energy demand. GEFCom was first held in 2012 on Kaggle, and the second GEFCom was held in 2014 on CrowdANALYTIX.

== GEFCom 2017 ==
IEEE Working Group on Energy Forecasting opened Global Energy Forecasting Competition 2017 (GEFCom2017) termed: Hierarchical Probabilistic Load Forecasting.

GEFCom2017 brought together state-of-the-art techniques and methodologies for hierarchical probabilistic energy forecasting. The competition featured a bi-level setup: a three-month qualifying match that included two tracks, and a one-month final match on a large-scale problem. In total 177 academic and company teams enrolled the competition.

Qualifying match defined data track winners:

- Ján Dolinský, Mária Starovská and Robert Toth (Tangent Works, Slovakia)
- Andrew J. Landgraf (Battelle, USA)
- Slawek Smyl (Uber Technologies, USA) and Grace Hua (Microsoft, USA)
- Gábor Nagy and Gergő Barta (Budapest University of Technology and Economics, Hungary), Gábor Simon (dmlab, Hungary)

Qualifying match open track winners:

- Geert Scholma (The Netherlands)
- Florian Ziel (Universität Duisburg-Essen, Germany)
- Jingrui Xie (SAS Institute, Inc., USA)

Final match winners:

- Isao Kanda and Juan Quintana (Japan Meteorological Corporation, Japan)
- Ján Dolinský, Mária Starovská and Robert Toth (Tangent Works https://www.tangent.works/, Slovakia)
- Gábor Nagy and Gergő Barta (Budapest University of Technology and Economics, Hungary), Gábor Simon (dmlab, Hungary)

== GEFCom 2014 ==
GEFCom2014 was announced by Dr. Tao Hong in an article for The Oracle, a publication of the International Institute of Forecasters. The competition was scheduled to begin on August 15, 2014 and end on December 15, 2014. In addition to individual prizes, GEFCom2014 also featured institute prizes for institutes with multiple well-performing teams. The best performers in the competition were invited to submit papers for a special issue of the International Journal of Forecasting on probabilistic energy forecasting. According to the website, GEFCom2014 had additional tracks in 2014: in addition to the hierarchical load forecasting and wind energy forecasting tracks, there was a price forecasting track and solar energy forecasting track. The IEEE Power & Energy Society was a sponsor of the competition.

== GEFCom 2012 ==
GEFCom 2012 was organized by a team comprising Dr. Tao Hong (Chair), Dr. Shu Fan (Vice Chair, Load Forecasting), and Dr. Pierre Pinson (Vice Chair, Wind Forecasting). Sponsors included the IEEE Working Group on Energy Forecasting, IEEE Power System Planning and Implementation Committee, IEEE Power and Energy Education Committee, IEEE Power and Energy Society, IEEE Transactions on Smart Grid, International Journal of Forecasting, WeatherBank Inc, and Kaggle. The competition was hosted on Kaggle, a service that runs data science competitions. It included two tracks: a hierarchical load forecasting track and a wind power forecasting track; both opened to contestants in September 2012. More than 200 teams submitted more than 2,000 entries focusing on hierarchical load forecasting and wind power forecasting. The winners were announced by the IEEE Power & Energy Society (one of the sponsors of the competition) on September 30, 2013.

The organizers of the competition described the results in an article in the April–June 2014 issue of the International Journal of Forecasting. Papers by the top performers in the competition describing their methods also appeared in the issue.

According to competition Chair Dr. Tao Hong, GEFCom2012 had five main aims:

1. Improve the forecasting practices of the utility industry
2. Bring together state-of-the-art techniques for energy forecasting
3. Bridge the gap between academic research and industry practice
4. Promote analytics in power and energy education
5. Prepare the industry to overcome the forecasting challenges brought by the smart grid technologies and renewable integration needs
