= HIRLAM =

Numerical weather prediction system

The High Resolution Limited Area Model (HIRLAM) is a numerical weather prediction forecast system developed by the international HIRLAM programme.

== Consortium ==
HIRLAM programme is a cooperation between following European meteorological institutes:

- Danish Meteorological Institute (DMI), Denmark
- Estonian Meteorological and Hydrological Institute (EMHI), Estonia
- Finnish Meteorological Institute (FMI), Finland
- Icelandic Meteorological Office (IMO), Iceland
- Lithuanian Hydrological and Meteorological Service (LHMS), Lithuania
- Met Éireann (ME), Ireland
- Norwegian Meteorological Institute (MET), Norway
- Royal Netherlands Meteorological Institute (KNMI), the Netherlands
- Agencia Estatal de Meteorología (AEMET), formerly INM, Spain
- Swedish Meteorological and Hydrological Institute (SMHI), Sweden

In addition, Météo-France, France, is a research partner in the international HIRLAM cooperation.

== The programme ==
The aim of the HIRLAM programme is to develop and maintain a numerical short-range weather forecasting system for operational use by the participating institutes. The cooperation, started in September 1985, comprises a series of 3-year projects between 1985 and 2005, and 5-year programmes HIRLAM-A (2006–2010) and HIRLAM-B (2011–2015). The collaboration resulted in successful launch of the limited area numerical weather prediction model, HIRLAM forecast system, which has been used in the HIRLAM member services for routine weather prediction of up to 3 days at a grid resolution of 3 to 16 km. Since 2006, the HIRLAM cooperation shifted its focus to the development of meso-scale (convection-permitting) numerical weather prediction system (HARMONIE) through close collaboration with the ALADIN consortium (led by Meteo France) and the ECMWF (European Center for Medium-range Weather Forecasting). The HARMONIE forecast system is the main operational weather forecast system at HIRLAM weather services with a typical grid resolution of 2.5 km. Through collaboration with the ALADIN consortium, a 52-ensemble Pan-European Grand Limited Area Ensemble Prediction System (GLAMEPS) has been developed by the HIRLAM programme. With a resolution of ca 8 km grid size GLAMEPS has been operational since 2013, to serve the needs of 2-day probabilistic forecasts at the HIRLAM and ALADIN member services.

The HIRLAM programme is controlled by the HIRLAM council, which consists of the directors of the participating institutes. The programme is managed by the management group consisting of:

- Jeanette Onvlee, KNMI, Programme Manager
- Jelena Bojarova, met.no, Project leader on data assimilation and use of observations
- Mariano Hortal, AEMET, Project leader on dynamics
- Laura Rontu, FMI, Project leader on physics
- Inger-lise Frogner, met.no, Project leader on probabilistic forecasting
- Xiaohua Yang, DMI, Project leader on quality assurance and operational cooperation
- Ulf Andrae, SMHI, Project leader on system

The management group is advised by a scientific and technical Advisory Committee.
