= Power system reliability =

Probability of a normal operation of the electrical grid at a given time

The power system reliability (sometimes grid reliability) is the probability of a normal operation of the electrical grid at a given time. Reliability indices characterize the ability of the electrical system to supply customers with electricity as needed by measuring the frequency, duration, and scale of supply interruptions. Traditionally two interdependent components of the power system reliability are considered:

- power system adequacy, a presence in the system of sufficient amounts of generation and transmission capacity;
- power system security (also called operational reliability), an ability of the system to withstand real-time contingencies (adverse events, e.g., an unexpected loss of generation capacity).

Ability of the system to limit the scale and duration of a power interruption is called resiliency. The same term is also used to describe the reaction of the system to the truly catastrophic events.

== Economics ==
Electric grid is an extremely important piece of infrastructure; a single daylong nationwide power outage can shave off 0.5% of the country's GDP. The cost of improvements is also high, so in practice a balance is sought to reach an "adequate level of reliability" at an acceptable cost.

== Adequacy ==
Resource adequacy (RA, also supply adequacy) is the ability of the electric grid to satisfy the end-user power demand at any time (typically this is an issue at the peak demand). For example, a sufficient unused dispatchable generation capacity and demand response resources shall be available to the electrical grid at any time so that major equipment failures (e.g., a disconnection of a nuclear power unit or a high-voltage power line) and fluctuations of power from variable renewable energy sources (e.g., due to wind dying down) can be accommodated.

A typical reliability index for the adequacy is the loss of load expectation (LOLE) of one event in 10 years (one-day-in-ten-years criterion). Due to the possible need for the actual addition of physical capacity, adequacy planning is long term (for example, PJM Interconnection requires capacity purchases to be 4 years in advance of delivery).

== Security ==
Security is the ability of the system to keep the real-time balance of the supply and demand, in particular immediately after a contingency by automatically ramping up generation and shedding the interruptible loads. Security relies on the operating reserve. Historically, the ancillary services (e.g., the inertial response) were provided by the spinning machinery of the synchronous generators, provisioning of these services got more complicated with proliferation of the inverter-based resources (e.g., solar photovoltaics and grid batteries). The typical requirement is "N-1 security" meaning that a sudden loss of one out of N major resources (a large generator or transmission line) should be pre-built into the system configuration at any time. The N-2 and N-3 contingencies refer to preparing for a simultaneous loss of, respectively, 2 or 3 major units; this is sometimes done for the critical area (e.g. downtown).

== Essential reliability services ==
North American Electric Reliability Corporation recognizes three services that have to be provided by the generation equipment in order for the grid to be reliable:

- voltage control;
- frequency support;
- ramping capability.

These capabilities are called essential reliability services (ERSs). If these are lacking, the grid cannot be secured. The contribution of synchronous generators toward these services is well understood.

== Methods ==
Enhancing power system reliability involves improving the system’s ability to deliver electricity continuously and with acceptable quality, even under fault or disturbance conditions. Below are key technical, operational, and planning methods for improving reliability at generation, transmission, and distribution levels.

=== Protection System Improvements ===
Improving protection systems is critical to ensuring that faults are detected and cleared quickly and accurately. Modern protection schemes, such as distance and differential relays, offer faster and more selective fault isolation compared to older electromechanical systems. Adaptive protection systems adjust their settings in real-time based on changing grid conditions, maintaining effectiveness across varying operating scenarios. Additionally, technologies like Fault Location, Isolation, and Service Restoration (FLISR) automate the restoration process, significantly reducing outage durations and affected areas. Methods involving strategically installing remote-controlled switches in distribution networks to reduce outage duration and restore service more rapidly after faults are a common practice.

=== System Redundancy ===
System redundancy involves designing the power system with additional components or alternative paths to ensure service continuity during failures. The N-1 contingency criterion, for example, ensures that the system can withstand the loss of any single element—such as a transmission line or generator—without causing widespread outages. Redundant lines, transformers, and backup generators allow the system to reroute power or increase generation when a component fails, significantly improving reliability and operational flexibility.

=== Smart Grid Technologies ===
Smart grid technologies enhance reliability by integrating advanced communication, sensing, and automation across the power system. With tools like Advanced Metering Infrastructure (AMI), utilities gain real-time visibility into grid performance and customer consumption, which allows for quicker fault detection and response. Automated switches and self-healing networks can detect and isolate faults in seconds, restoring power to unaffected areas without manual intervention. Furthermore, phasor measurement units (PMUs) used in Wide Area Monitoring Systems (WAMS) help maintain grid stability through synchronized, high-resolution data monitoring.

=== Distributed Energy Resources and Microgrids ===
The integration of Distributed Energy Resources (DERs), such as solar panels, wind turbines, and battery storage, into the power grid provides localized generation that enhances system reliability. Microgrids, which can operate both connected to and independent from the main grid, offer resilience by supplying critical loads during main grid outages. When paired with energy storage, these systems can respond to sudden load changes or supply gaps, reducing the system’s dependence on centralized generation and long transmission lines, which are more vulnerable to failures.

=== Predictive Maintenance and Condition Monitoring ===
Predictive maintenance uses real-time data and diagnostic tools to assess the condition of power system components, enabling early detection of potential failures. Techniques such as thermal imaging, vibration analysis, and dissolved gas analysis in transformers help identify anomalies before they lead to outages. IoT-based sensors further enhance this approach by providing continuous health monitoring. This data-driven strategy allows utilities to move from reactive to proactive maintenance, thereby reducing unplanned downtime and improving equipment reliability.

=== System Hardening and Infrastructure Upgrades ===
System hardening involves physical improvements to grid infrastructure to withstand extreme conditions such as storms, floods, and wildfires. Examples include replacing overhead lines with underground cables, reinforcing poles and towers, and elevating or waterproofing substations in flood-prone areas. These measures reduce the physical vulnerability of the system to environmental threats and aging infrastructure, thereby improving the long-term reliability and safety of the power supply.

=== Reliability-Centered Planning and Operation ===
Reliability-centered planning emphasizes the design and operation of the grid based on reliability performance metrics such as SAIFI, SAIDI, and CAIDI. Planners use advanced tools to forecast load growth, evaluate equipment aging, and perform power flow and contingency analyses to identify weak points. Distribution network reconfiguration—such as rerouting power through alternative feeders—can help balance loads and improve voltage stability. This targeted approach ensures that investments and operational changes are prioritized for maximum reliability impact.

=== Optimization and Simulation Tools ===
Optimization and simulation tools are used to evaluate and improve the reliability of power systems by modeling their behavior under various scenarios. Power flow, transient, and contingency analyses help engineers assess the system’s ability to withstand disturbances. Advanced methods like Monte Carlo simulations quantify probabilistic risk and expected failures. Mixed-Integer Linear Programming (MILP) and other optimization algorithms help determine optimal DER placements, switching actions, and investment decisions that enhance system resilience while minimizing costs.

=== Regulatory and Policy Support ===
Regulatory and policy frameworks play a crucial role in promoting power system reliability by mandating standards and incentivizing best practices. Organizations like NERC (North American Electric Reliability Corporation) establish reliability standards that utilities must follow. Additionally, governments and regulatory bodies may offer financial incentives for investments in infrastructure upgrades, DER integration, or resilience technologies. Policies that prioritize reliability ensure accountability and create a structured environment for continuous improvement in power system performance.

== See also ==
- List of long-duration energy storage
- Power system protection

== Sources ==
- Ahmed, Faraedoon; Al Kez, Dlzar; McLoone, Seán; Best, Robert James; Cameron, Ché; Foley, Aoife (2023). "Dynamic grid stability in low carbon power systems with minimum inertia". Renewable Energy. 210: 486–506. Bibcode:2023REne..210..486A. doi:10.1016/j.renene.2023.03.082.
- "Resource Adequacy Report Evaluating the Reliability and Security of the United States Electric Grid" (PDF). US Department of Energy. Department of Energy. July 2025.
- Heylen, Evelyn; De Boeck, Steven; Ovaere, Marten; Ergun, Hakan; Van Hertem, Dirk (26 January 2018). "Steady-State Security". Dynamic Vulnerability Assessment and Intelligent Control for Sustainable Power Systems. John Wiley & Sons, Ltd. pp. 21–40. doi:10.1002/9781119214984.ch2. ISBN 9781119214984.
- Geocaris, Madeline (August 10, 2022). "Assessing Power System Reliability in a Changing Grid, Environment". NREL.gov. National Renewable Energy Laboratory.
- NERC (2015). "Essential Reliability Services" (PDF).
- Prada, Jose Fernando (2017). Ensuring the Reliable Operation of the Power Grid: State-Based and Distributed Approaches to Scheduling Energy and Contingency Reserves (PhD). Carnegie Mellon University.
- Tezak, Christine (June 24, 2005). Resource Adequacy - Alphabet Soup! (PDF). Stanford Washington Research Group.
- Willis, H. Lee (1 March 2004). "Contingency-based planning criteria". Power Distribution Planning Reference Book, Second Edition (2 ed.). CRC Press. pp. 499–500. ISBN 978-1-4200-3031-0.
