= Expected unserved energy =

Power-system reliability measure

Expected unserved energy (EUE), sometimes called expected energy not supplied (or not served, EENS) and a loss of energy expectation, (LOEE), is a key grid reliability metric ("reliability index" from the loss of energy group) used to assess the resource adequacy of electricity generation. The deterministic version of this index is called unserved energy (USE). It represents the total amount of energy that is expected to be undelivered to customers when the demand for electricity exceeds the available supply. EUE is typically expressed in megawatt hours (MWh) per year. Normalized (by dividing EUE by total load over a whole period, for example, a year) value normalized expected unserved energy (NEUE, also known as NUSE for the deterministic version), allows comparison of across different system sizes.

Unlike the non-energy indices such as loss of load expectation (LOLE), which only measures the anticipated time of a supply shortfall, EUE quantifies the volume of the energy deficit and thus the possible economic loss.

== Calculation and methodology ==
EUE is calculated by summing up the probable amounts of unserved energy for each period of a potential shortfall over a given timeframe, usually one year. The calculation involves multiplying the probability of electrical outage by the amount of energy that was expected to be delivered, but was curtailed due to the outage.

System operators and planners use sophisticated probabilistic models to compute EUE. These models account for a wide range of variables, including:

- The probability of forced outages for each generating unit.
- Scheduled maintenance for generators.
- Limitations on power transmission between different regions.
- The variability of renewable energy sources like wind and solar.
- Forecasts of hourly electricity demand.

== Target values ==
Multiple operators have chosen NUSE thresholds between 0.001% and 0.003%.

For example, the Australian Energy Market Operator targets the 0.002% normalized value. In the US, the use of NUSE is not standardized, yet the US Department of Energy and North American Electric Reliability Corporation have selected the same threshold of 0.002%, with some US entities considering much lower limits of 0.0001% to 0.0002%.

== Sources ==
- Arteconi, Alessia; Bruninx, Kenneth (7 February 2018). "Energy Reliability and Management". Comprehensive Energy Systems. Vol. 5. Elsevier. p. 140. ISBN 978-0-12-814925-6. OCLC 1027476919.
- Australian Energy Market Commission (2020). Transparency of Unserved Energy Calculation (PDF) (Report).
- Billinton, Roy; Allan, Ronald N. (1996). Reliability Evaluation of Power Systems (PDF) (2nd ed.). New York: Plenum Press. ISBN 978-0-306-45259-8.
- Cretì, Anna; Fontini, Fulvio (30 May 2019). Economics of Electricity: Markets, Competition and Rules. Cambridge University Press. pp. 117–. ISBN 978-1-107-18565-4.
- New York State Reliability Council (2020). Resource Adequacy Metrics and Their Applications (PDF) (Report).
- Department of Energy (July 2025). "Resource Adequacy Report Evaluating the Reliability and Security of the United States Electric Grid" (PDF). US Department of Energy.
- Saket, R. K.; Sanjeevikumar, P. (2022). Reliability Analysis of Modern Power Systems. Wiley-IEEE Press. ISBN 9781394226757.
