= Unison Networks =

New Zealand electricity generator company

- Industry: Electricity distribution
- Predecessor: Hawke's Bay Electric Power Board
- Founded: 1924
- Headquarters: Hastings, New Zealand
- Area served: Hawkes Bay, Rotorua, Taupō
- Key people: Rob Wheater (Chair); Jaun Park (CEO)
- Revenue: $210m
- Net income: $27m
- Total assets: $721m
- Total equity: $343m
- Parent: Hawke's Bay Power Consumers' Trust
- Website: www.unison.co.nz

Unison Networks Limited (Unison) is an electricity distribution company based in Hastings, New Zealand.

Unison owns and manages the electricity lines network in the Hawke's Bay, Rotorua and Taupō regions. The service area covers 12,000 km^{2}. The Unison group also provides electrical, civil, and vegetation contracting services; manufactures electrical products; and operates an insurance company.

== History ==
Early in the twentieth century, electricity generation and distribution was managed by local councils or municipal departments. An electricity network was established in Hastings in 1912, with a power house in Eastbourne Street. Following changes to national legislation, the Hawke's Bay Electric Power Board was formed in 1924.

In 1993 a new entity, Hawke’s Bay Power Limited (HBPL), owned by the Hawke’s Bay Power Consumers’ Trust (HBPCT), took over the ownership of the electricity generation and distribution assets of the Hawke's Bay Electric Power Board. The Electricity Industry Reform Act 1998 required the separation of ownership of lines businesses from energy trading businesses. In 1998, the energy retail business of HBPL was purchased by Contact Energy and HBPL was renamed as Hawke’s Bay Network Ltd. Following a series of mergers and acquisitions, the company was renamed as Unison Networks Limited (trading as Unison), on 17 April 2003. It remained wholly owned by the HBPCT.

== Ownership ==
The company is 100% owned by the Hawke's Bay Power Consumers' Trust on behalf of electricity consumers in the Hawke's Bay area. The Trust is made up of five elected Trustees and operates under a Trust Deed. The trust elects trustees every three years, with the most recent election happening in 2024.

== Distribution network ==
The Unison subtransmission and distribution network is supplied from the national grid via Transpower substations. Seven Transpower grid exit points (GXPs) supply the Unison network: Redclyffe, Fernhill, and Whakatu for Napier-Hastings; Wairakei for Taupo; and Rotorua, Owhata, and Takurenga for Rotorua.

=== Network statistics ===
Unison Networks Limited network statistics for the year ending 31 March 2024
Parameter	Value
Regulatory asset base	$886 million
Line charge revenue	$145.5 million
Capital expenditure	$102.6 million
Operating expenditure	$50.9 million
Customer connections	119,182
Energy delivered	1,674 GWh
Peak demand	338 MW
Total line length	9,403 km
Distribution and low-voltage overhead lines	5,072 km
Distribution and low-voltage underground cables	3,831 km
Subtransmission lines and cables	500 km
Poles	65,930
Distribution transformers	10,383
Zone substation transformers	60
Average interruption duration (SAIDI)	208 minutes
Average interruption frequency (SAIFI)	2.50

== Subsidiaries ==
- Unison Contracting Services Limited
- Unison Energy Limited
- Unison Fibre Limited
- Unison Insurance Limited
- ETEL Limited
- RPS Switchgear
- PBA - The High Voltage Experts

== See also ==
- Electricity sector in New Zealand
