= Duck curve =

Timing imbalance of energy demand and solar power generation

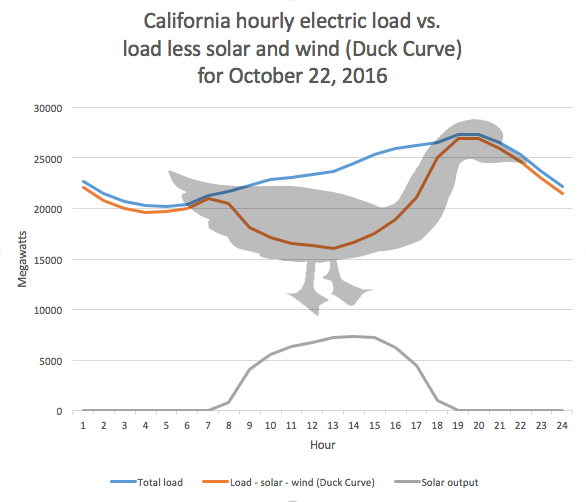
The Duck Curve Blue curve: Total electrical power demand (load) Orange curve: (the duck curve) supply of electrical power from dispatchable sources, Gray curve: supply of solar power Data is for the State of California on October 22, 2016 (a Saturday), a day when the wind power output was low and steady throughout the day. From 07:00 to 22:00, the orange curve resembles the outline of a duck. From 17:00 to 18:00 as the sun sets, about 5 gigawatt of generating capacity from dispatchable sources must come on line within one hour. Blue curve = Orange curve + Gray curve + wind power.

The duck curve is a graph showing the electricity demand remaining after subtracting electricity supplied by variable renewable energy sources (primarily solar) over the course of a day. This highlights the timing imbalance between demand and solar power generation, which must be filled by dispatchable generation. The curve is named for its visual similarity to the outline of a duck. Used in utility-scale electricity generation, the term was coined in 2012 by the California Independent System Operator.

== Solar power ==
In some energy markets, daily peak demand occurs after sunset, when solar power is no longer available. In locations where a substantial amount of solar electric capacity has been installed, the amount of power that must be generated from sources other than solar or wind displays a rapid increase around sunset and peaks in the mid-evening hours, producing a graph that resembles the silhouette of a duck. In Hawaii, significant adoption of solar generation has led to the more pronounced curve known as the Nessie curve.

Without any form of energy storage, after times of high solar generation, power companies must rapidly increase other forms of power generation around the time of sunset to compensate for the loss of solar generation, a major concern for grid operators where there is rapid growth of photovoltaics. Storage such as dammed hydropower can fix these issues if it can be implemented. Short term use batteries, at a large enough scale of use, can help to flatten the duck curve and prevent generator use fluctuation and can help to maintain voltage profile.

== Duck curve in California ==
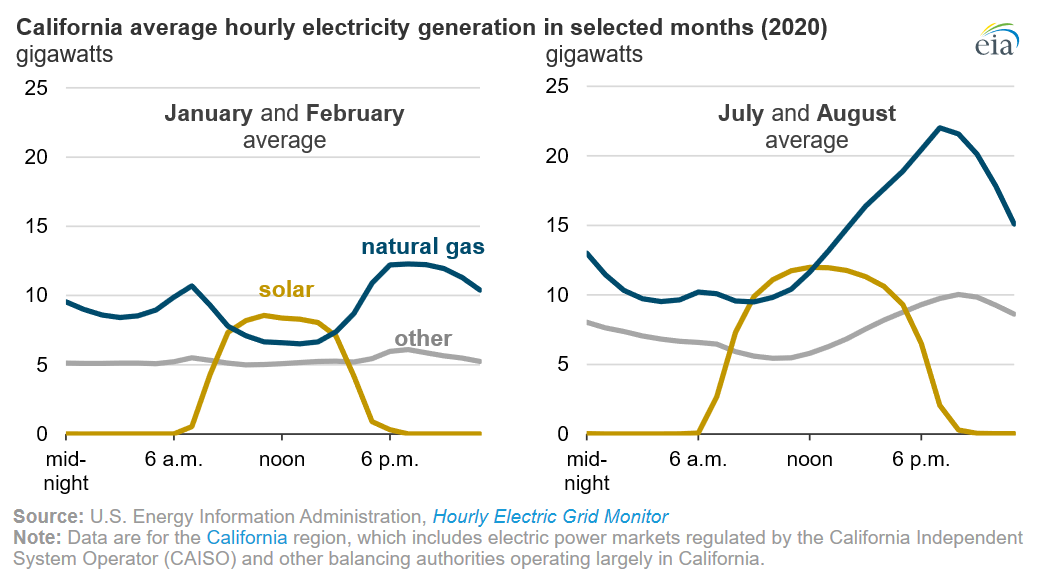
Sources of electricity generation in California in 2020. Because these graphs do not display energy demand, they are not Duck Curves themselves, but demonstrate daily and seasonal variation in power production. Natural gas Solar power

The California Independent System Operator (CAISO) has been monitoring and analyzing the Duck Curve and its future expectations for about a half a century now and their biggest finding is the growing gap between morning and evening hours prices relative to midday hours prices. According to their 2016 study, the U.S. Energy Information Administration, found that the wholesale energy market prices over the past six months during the 5 pm to 8 pm period (the "neck" of the duck) have increased to $60 per megawatt-hour, compared to about $35 per megawatt-hour in the same time frame in 2016. However, on the other side they have measured a drastic decrease in the midday prices, nearing $15 per megawatt-hour. These high peaks and deep valleys are only showing continued trends of going further apart making this Duck Curve even more prevalent as renewable energy production continues to grow.

A crucial part of this curve comes from the net load ("the difference between expected load and anticipated electricity production from the range of renewable energy sources"). In certain times of the year (namely spring and summer), the curves create a "belly" appearance in the midday that then drastically increases portraying an "arch" similar to the neck of a duck, consequently the name "The Duck Chart." This "neck" represents a ramp speed of between 10 and 17 GW in 3 hours (afternoon) in 2020 which has to be supplied by flexible generation. During the midday, large amounts of solar energy are created, which partially contributes to lower demand for additional electricity. Curtailment impacts the curve. Increasing battery storage can mitigate the issues of solar abundance during the day. When excess solar energy is stored during the day and used in the evening, the price disparity between inexpensive midday and expensive evening energy can be reduced. Enough total solar technology exists to power the world, but there is a current lack of infrastructure to store solar energy for later use. An oversupply of energy during low demand coupled with a lack of supply during high demand explains the large disparity between midday and evening energy prices. As of 2022, up to 6 GWh is shifted per day from low price to high price periods.

By 2024, the addition of massive battery systems in California had greatly decreased the severity off the duck curve. In the evening, massive arrays of grid batteries discharge to meet the sunset peak, shortening the duck's neck and removing the reliance on natural gas peaker plants.

== Mitigation strategies ==
Methods for coping with the rapid increase in demand at sunset reflected in the duck curve, which becomes more serious as the penetration of solar generation grows, include:

- Installing more dispatchable generation
  - Flexibility incentives can increase the dispatchability of electricity generation from biomass.
- Orienting some solar collectors toward the west to maximize generation near sunset.
- Energy storage including:
  - Pumped-storage hydroelectricity
  - Battery storage power stations These can be colocated with solar power plants that are designed with DC capacity above their AC rating, or at other suitable sites, including old fossil fuel plants so as to utilize their existing transmission infrastructure (e.g. the Moss Landing Power Plant).
  - Solar thermal energy with thermal energy storage
  - Ice storage air conditioning
  - Use of batteries in electric vehicles for temporary storage (vehicle-to-grid)
  - Power-to-X, storing surplus electricity production in chemical form, e.g. hydrogen
  - Green hydrogen production from water during the peak hours of Solar production
- Energy demand management, including:
  - Time-of-use pricing (TOU) and real-time pricing
  - Smart grid technology
  - Electric power transmission from the west where the sun is shining to the east where the sun is low or set

A major challenge is deploying mitigating capacity at a rate that keeps up with the growth of solar energy production. The effects of the duck curve have happened faster than anticipated.

== See also ==
- Dunkelflaute
