= MAIFI =

Reliability index

The Momentary Average Interruption Frequency Index (MAIFI) is a reliability index used by electric power utilities. MAIFI is the average number of momentary interruptions that a customer would experience during a given period (typically a year). Electric power utilities may define momentary interruptions differently, with some considering a momentary interruption to be an outage of less than 1 minute in duration while others may consider a momentary interruption to be an outage of less than 5 minutes in duration.

== Calculation ==
MAIFI is calculated as

$\mbox{MAIFI} = \frac{\mbox{total number of customer interruptions less than the defined time}}{\mbox{total number of customers served}}$

== Reporting ==
MAIFI has tended to be less reported than other reliability indicators, such as SAIDI, SAIFI, and CAIDI. However, MAIFI is useful for tracking momentary power outages, or "blinks," that can be hidden or misrepresented by an overall outage duration index like SAIDI or SAIFI.

== Causes ==
Momentary power outages are often caused by transient faults, such as lightning strikes or vegetation contacting a power line, and many utilities use reclosers to automatically restore power quickly after a transient fault has cleared.

== Comparisons ==
MAIFI is specific to the area ( power utility, state, region, county, power line, etc. ) because of the many variables that affect the measure: high/low lightning, number & type of trees, high/low winds, etc. Therefore, comparing MAIFI of one power utility to another is not valid and should not be used in this type of benchmarking. It also is difficult to compare this measure of reliability within a single utility. One year may have had an unusually high number of thunderstorms and thus skew any comparison to another year's MAIFI.
