= Resource adequacy =

Resource adequacy (RA, also supply adequacy) in the field of electric power is the ability of the electric grid to satisfy the end-user power demand at any time (typically an issue at the peak demand). RA is a component of the electrical grid reliability. For example, sufficient unused generation capacity shall be available to the electrical grid at any time to accommodate contingencies (major equipment failures, e.g., a disconnection of a nuclear power unit or a high-voltage power line) and drops in variable renewable energy sources (e.g, wind dying down). The adequacy standard should satisfy the chosen reliability index, typically the loss of load expectation (LOLE) of 1 day in 10 years (so called "1-in-10").

== Installed reserve margin ==
Installed reserve margin (IRM) is the amount of the generating capacity in excess of the expected load, calculated to satisfy the loss of load expectation, typically 1 day in 10 years. IRM is used to measure the adequacy of the generation capacity and serves as a guide to evaluate the needs for the capacity changes. When discussing the future capacity needs, the planning reserve margin term is used for the metric. North American Electric Reliability Corporation (NERC) by default uses the 15% reserve target for the mostly thermal power systems, 10% for the hydroelectric ones. The IRM is different from the operating reserve margin (ORM). The ORM calculations account for the current generation and transmission outages and assume that all the demand response and interruptible power loads are connected. ORM is thus lower than IRM (CAISO allows ORM as low as 3%).

== Vertically integrated utility ==
In the case of a vertically integrated electric utility RA was part of the integrated resource planning, done by the utility itself, additional expenses were negotiated with regulators that were representing the captive customers. These monopoly utilities had an incentive to overestimate the peak demand in order to build more capacity and justify an increase in their regulator-approved rates. Lack of capacity generally was not a problem.

== Deregulated grid ==
In a deregulated grid some sort of incentives are necessary for market participants to build and maintain generation and transmission resources that may some day be called upon to maintain the grid balance, but most of the time are idled and do not produce revenue from the sale of electricity. An installed capacity requirement (ICAP) is used by some independent system operator to maintain the RA requirements. ICAP allows a member of a power pool to avoid building its own spare generation capacity to satisfy the RA and instead purchase "ICAP credits" from some other company in the pool that already has such capacity (the probability of two companies falling below their RA targets simultaneously is considered to be negligible). The ICAP obligation is called upon not by a purchaser, but by the regional transmission organization, which also requires the suppliers to offer all available resources on a day-ahead basis ("must-offer"). If a unit that received the ICAP payment is called upon, it must run.

Typical regulator requires a load serving entity to purchase firm capacity RA contracts for 110-120% of its annual peak power. As any capacity-based scheme, this approach relies on credible estimates of firm capacity. These estimates are easy for conventional dispatchable sources, but complicated in case of hydropower and renewables, as the available energy from these sources tend to be highly correlated over a large geographical area. Incorporation of solar and wind generators into firm capacity frameworks presents challenges due to their intermittency (cf. Capacity credit) and might require the usage of energy storage.

== Price cap and RA ==
Electricity markets are quite unique in their need for an RA mechanism, even though the high fixed cost/low marginal cost nature of electricity production is fairly typical among other industries that have no problems recovering production costs and generating return on investment at market-determined prices. However, customers of electric utilities frequently do not have an ability to shift their consumption away from high-priced periods (consider, for example, the space heating needs). Under these circumstances the scarcity pricing does not immediately affect the consumption and becomes punitive. "Energy-only markets have the potential to result in an equilibrium point for the market that is not consistent with what users and regulators want to see", so every wholesale electricity market in the world relies on offer caps in some form.

Wolak points to the combination of offer caps and electricity shortage mitigation strategies (rolling blackouts) leading to the need for an RA mechanism (Wolak calls this dependency a reliability externality): the price cap creates an incentive for load-serving entities (LSEs) to underpay for the electricity on the forward market, while the rolling blackouts equally penalize the LSEs that did procure sufficient resources and the ones that did not. This results in a missing money problem (in the form of a lack of investment into generation facilities). Per Wolak, lower offer caps complicate the situation, as do the electrification of space heating, adoption of electric vehicles, and an increasing share of the variable renewable energy sources.

== Sources ==
- Tezak, Christine (June 24, 2005). Resource Adequacy - Alphabet Soup! (PDF). Stanford Washington Research Group.
- Wolak, Frank A. (July 2021), Long-Term Resource Adequacy in Wholesale Electricity Markets with Significant Intermittent Renewables (PDF), National Bureau of Economic Research, doi:10.3386/w29033
- Aagaard, Todd; Kleit, Andrew N. (2022). "Too Much Is Never Enough: Constructing Electricity Capacity Market Demand" (PDF). Energy Law Journal. 43 (1). Washington: 79–124.
- Pechman, Carl (1993). "Model-Limited Choice and the Determination of the Need for Generation Capacity". Regulating Power: The Economics of Electricity in the Information Age. Springer US. pp. 77–97. doi:10.1007/978-1-4615-3258-3_5. ISBN 978-0-7923-9347-4.
- PJM (August 25, 2021). "PJM Manual 20: PJM Resource Adequacy Analysis". PJM Resource Adequacy Planning.
- NERC (May 2013). "2013 Summer Reliability Assessment" (PDF). nerc.com. North American Electric Reliability Corporation.
