= Reliability index =

Assessment of power system reliability

Reliability index is an attempt to quantitatively assess the reliability of a system using a single numerical value. The set of reliability indices varies depending on the field of engineering, and multiple different indices may be used to characterize a single system. In the simple case of an object that cannot be used or repaired once it fails, a useful index is the mean time to failure representing an expectation of the object's service lifetime. Another cross-disciplinary index is forced outage rate (FOR), a probability that a particular type of a device is out of order. Reliability indices are extensively used in the modern electricity regulation to assess the grid reliability.

== Power distribution networks ==
Electric power distribution networks can be characterized using a vast variety of reliability indices. These indices often quantify either the duration or the frequency of power interruptions; some attempt to combine both in a single number, which is extremely difficult. All indices are computed over a defined period, usually a year. Popular indices are typically customer-oriented (few are load-based), some come in pairs, where the "System" (S) in the name indicates an average across all customers and "Customer" (C) indicates an average across only the affected customers (the ones who had at least one interruption).

=== Interruption-based indices ===
The interruptions of the power supply affecting the customers can be either momentary (short, usually defined as less than 1 or 5 minutes) or "sustained" (the longer ones). Most indices in this group count the sustained interruptions.

- System Average Interruption Duration Index (SAIDI) is most frequently used and represents the average total duration of power interruption per customer;
- Customer Average Interruption Duration Index (CAIDI) is an average duration of interruption;
- Customer Total Average Interruption Duration Index (CTAIDI) is an average duration of an interruptions at affected customers;
- System Average Interruption Frequency Index (SAIFI) is also frequently used and represents a number of power interruptions per average customer;
- Customer Average Interruption Frequency Index (CAIFI) represents an average number of power interruptions per affected customer, CAIFI = CTAIDI / CAIDI;
- Average Service Availability Index (ASAI) is a ratio of total hours the customers were actually served to the number of hours they had requested the service.
- Customers experiencing multiple interruptions (CEMI_{n}) is a ratio of number of customers that experience more than n interruptions to the total number of customers served.
- Momentary Average Interruption Frequency Index (MAIFI) represents an average number of momentary interrupts per customer. If MAIFI is specified, momentary interruptions are usually excluded from SAIFI, so from the customer's point of view, the total number of interruptions will be SAIFI+MAIFI;
- Momentary average interruption event frequency index (MAIFI_{E}) represents the average frequency of momentary interruptions.
- Customers experiencing multiple sustained interruption and momentary interruption events (CEMSMI_{n}) represents the share of customers experiencing more than n of either sustained or momentary interruptions events to the total number of customers served.

=== Load-based indices ===
Load-based indices are similar to their customer-based counterparts, but are calculated based on load. In a system with a lot of small customers, load-based indices will be equal to their customer-based counterparts, but if the system has few major (industrial) customers, they might diverge.

- Average system interruption frequency index (ASIFI) is similar to SAIFI.
- Average system interruption duration index (ASIDI) is similar to SAIDI.

=== History ===
Electric utilities came into existence in the late 19th century and since their inception had to respond to problems in their distribution systems. Primitive means were used at first: the utility operator would get phone calls from the customers that lost power, put pins into a wall map at their locations and would try to guess the fault location based on the clustering of the pins. The accounting for the outages was purely internal, and for years there was no attempt to standardize it (in the US, until mid-1940s). In 1947, a joint study by the Edison Electric Institute and IEEE (at the time still AIEE) included a section on fault rates for the overhead distribution lines, results were summarized by Westinghouse Electric in 1959 in the detailed Electric Utility Engineering Reference Book: Distribution Systems.

In the US, the interest in reliability assessments of generation, transmission, substations, and distribution picked up after the Northeast blackout of 1965. A work by Capra et al. in 1969 suggested designing systems to standardized levels of reliability and suggested a metric similar to the modern SAIFI. SAIFI, SAIDI, CAIDI, ASIFI, and AIDI came to widespread use in the 1970s and were originally computed based on the data from the paper outage tickets, the computerized outage management systems (OMS) were used primarily to replace the "pushpin" method of tracking outages. IEEE started an effort for standardization of the indices through its Power Engineering Society. The working group, operating under different names (Working Group on Performance Records for Optimizing System Design, Working Group on Distribution Reliability, Distribution Reliability Working Group, standards IEEE P1366, IEEE P1782), came up with reports that defined most of the modern indices in use. Notably, SAIDI, SAIFI, CAIDI, CAIFI, ASAI, and ALII were defined in a Guide For Reliability Measurement and Data Collection (1971). In 1981 the electrical utilities had funded an effort to develop a computer program to predict the reliability indices at Electric Power Research Institute (EPRI itself was created as a response to the outage of 1965). In mid-1980, the electric utilities underwent workforce reductions, state regulatory bodies became concerned that the reliability can suffer as a result and started to request annual reliability reports. With personal computers becoming ubiquitous in 1990s, the OMS became cheaper and almost all utilities installed them. By 1998 64% of the utility companies were required by the state regulators to report the reliability (although only 18% included the momentary events into the calculations).

== Resource adequacy ==
For the electricity generation systems the indices typically reflect the balance between the system's ability to generate the electricity ("capacity") and its consumption ("demand") and are sometimes referred to as adequacy indices; as NERC distinguishes adequacy (will there be enough capacity?) and security (will it work when disturbed?) aspects of reliability. It is assumed that if the cases of demand exceeding the generation capacity are sufficiently rare and short, the distribution network will be able to avoid a power outage by either obtaining energy via an external interconnection or by load shedding. It is further assumed that the distribution system is ideal and capable of distributing the load in any generation configuration.

Ibanez and Milligan postulate that the reliability metrics for generation in practice are linearly related. In particular, the capacity credit values calculated based on any of the factors were found to be "rather close".

=== Probabilistic vs. deterministic ===
The indices for the resource availability are broadly classified into deterministic and probabilistic groups:

- deterministic indices are easier to use, historically popular, and are used when there is little uncertainty (during the hours-ahead operation or to analyze the past events) or in situations when the statistical calculations are infeasible;
- probabilistic metrics assume that the calculation inputs have uncertainty and estimate resource adequacy by statistically combining their distributions. These indices take accommodate multiple possible situations and thus can be more accurate. EPRI further subdivides probabilistic indices into:
  - average risk metrics that provide an average value of the index based on statistical distribution. This is the class of metrics that are typically used, and are further subdivided into frequency and duration indices that characterize the occurrence of adverse events (for example, the "loss of load"-related indices assess the probability or duration of a potential outage) and magnitude metrics that characterize the effects of the events (for example, the expected unserved energy measures the total energy loss for customers). Both subtypes can be combined;
  - full distribution metric produce a range of values in the distribution instead of a single average value. This is a relatively new class of metrics.

=== Probabilistic metrics ===
Indices based on statistics include:

- loss of load probability (LOLP) reflects the probability of the demand exceeding the capacity in a given interval of time (for example, a year) before any emergency measures are taken. It is defined as a percentage of time during which the load on the system exceeds its capacity;
- loss of load expectation (LOLE) is the total duration of the expected loss of load events in days, LOLH is its equivalent in hours;
- expected unserved energy (EUE) is an amount of the additional energy that would be required to fully satisfy the demand within some period (usually a year). Also known as "expected energy not served" (or not supplied, EENS), and as loss of energy expectation, LOEE. Normalized (by dividing EUE by total load over a whole period (for example, a year) value "normalized expected unserved energy" NEUE (also known as NUSE) allows comparison of across different system sizes. In the US, an acceptable value of this dimensionless index is not standardized, yet the US Department of Energy selected the threshold of 0.002%.
- loss of load events (LOLEV) is a number of situations in which the demand exceeded the capacity;
- expected power not supplied (EPNS);
- loss of energy probability (LOEP);
- energy index of reliability (EIR);
- interruption duration index (IDI) (this is just another name for SAIDI);
- energy curtailed.

=== Deterministic metrics ===
The deterministic indices include:

- the installed reserve margin (RM, a percentage of generating capacity exceeding the maximum anticipated load) was traditionally used by the utilities, with values in the US reaching 20%-25% until the economic pressures of 1970s. EPRI distinguishes between:
  - planning reserve margin (PRM) that uses the ratio calculated at the time of pealk demand (accounting for the FOR in conventional units and output variations of the variable renewable energy) and
  - energy reserve margin (ERM) that is similar to the PRM and is calculated for every hour, not just the peak one.
- the largest unit (LU) index is based on the idea that the spare capacity needs to be related to the capacity of the largest generator in the system, that can be taken out by a single fault;
- for the systems with significant role of the hydropower, the margin shall also be related to a power shortages in the "dry year" (a predefined condition of low water supply, usually a year or sequence of years.

== Sources ==
- Willis, H. Lee (1 March 2004). Power Distribution Planning Reference Book, Second Edition (2 ed.). CRC Press. pp. 111–122, 132. ISBN 978-1-4200-3031-0.
- Gnedenko, Boris; Pavlov, Igor V.; Ushakov, Igor A. (3 May 1999). Sumantra Chakravarty (ed.). Statistical Reliability Engineering. John Wiley & Sons. p. 4. ISBN 978-0-471-12356-9. OCLC 1167003263.
- Layton, Lee (2004). "Electric System Reliability Indices" (PDF). www.egr.unlv.edu.
- Qamber, Isa S. (13 March 2020). "Generating Systems Reliability Indices". Power Systems Control and Reliability: Electric Power Design and Enhancement. CRC Press. ISBN 978-1-00-071082-3.
- Brown, Richard E. (19 December 2017). "Reliability Metrics and Indices". Electric Power Distribution Reliability (2 ed.). CRC Press. pp. 41–101. ISBN 978-0-8493-7568-2.
- EPRI (October 2000). Reliability of Electric Utility Distribution Systems: EPRI White Paper (PDF). Palo Alto: Electric Power Research Institute.
- EPRI (2021-10-08). "Metrics Explainers". EPRI Micro Sites. Electric Power Research Institute.
- Billinton, Roy; Li, Wenyuan (30 November 1994). "Adequacy Indices". Reliability Assessment of Electric Power Systems Using Monte Carlo Methods. Springer Science & Business Media. pp. 22–29. ISBN 978-0-306-44781-5. OCLC 1012458483.
- David Elmakias, ed. (7 July 2008). New Computational Methods in Power System Reliability. Springer Science & Business Media. p. 174. ISBN 978-3-540-77810-3. OCLC 1050955963.
- Arteconi, Alessia; Bruninx, Kenneth (7 February 2018). "Energy Reliability and Management". Comprehensive Energy Systems. Vol. 5. Elsevier. p. 140. ISBN 978-0-12-814925-6. OCLC 1027476919.
- Meier, Alexandra von (30 June 2006). Electric Power Systems: A Conceptual Introduction. John Wiley & Sons. p. 229. ISBN 978-0-470-03640-2. OCLC 1039149555.
- Ibanez, Eduardo; Milligan, Michael (July 2014), "Comparing resource adequacy metrics and their influence on capacity value" (PDF), 2014 International Conference on Probabilistic Methods Applied to Power Systems (PMAPS), IEEE, pp. 1–6, doi:10.1109/PMAPS.2014.6960610, hdl:11556/8706, ISBN 978-1-4799-3561-1, OSTI 1127287, S2CID 3135204
- Malik, Arif; Albadi, Mohammed (15 July 2021). "Capacity Value of Photovoltaics for Estimating the Adequacy of a Power Generation System". Solar Photovoltaic Power Intermittency and Implications on Power Systems. Cambridge Scholars Publishing. pp. 155–182. ISBN 978-1-5275-7242-3. OCLC 1263286601.
- Ela, Erik; Milligan, Michael; Bloom, Aaron; Botterud, Audun; Townsend, Aaron; Levin, Todd (2018). "Long-Term Resource Adequacy, Long-Term Flexibility Requirements, and Revenue Sufficiency". Electricity Markets with Increasing Levels of Renewable Generation: Structure, Operation, Agent-based Simulation, and Emerging Designs. Studies in Systems, Decision and Control. Vol. 144. Springer International Publishing. pp. 129–164. doi:10.1007/978-3-319-74263-2_6. eISSN 2198-4190. ISBN 978-3-319-74261-8. ISSN 2198-4182.
- IEEE Guide for Electric Power Distribution Reliability Indices, IEEE 1366, 2012, doi:10.1109/IEEESTD.2012.6209381
- Department of Energy (July 2025). "Resource Adequacy Report Evaluating the Reliability and Security of the United States Electric Grid" (PDF). US Department of Energy.
