= Average Service Availability Index =

The Average Service Availability Index (ASAI) is a reliability index commonly used by electric power utilities. ASAI is calculated as

$\mbox{ASAI} = \frac{\sum{N_i} \times 8760 - \sum{U_i N_i}}{\sum{N_i} \times 8760}$

where $N_i$ is the number of customers and $U_i$ is the annual outage time (in hours) for location $i$. ASAI can be represented in relation to SAIDI (when the annual SAIDI is given in hours, 8760 is the number of hours in a year)

$\mbox{ASAI} = 1 - \frac{\mbox{SAIDI} }{8760}$
