= Load serving entity =

Electric power company

Load serving entity (LSE) in a deregulated electricity market is a company or government agency that is obligated by law or via a long-term contract to provide electrical power to end-users. The term is used in regulation, yet is vague and thus subject to prolonged political wrangling. For example, the US law defines an LSE as an obligation-bound provider of electricity directly to consumers or to a utility that serves the consumers. FERC defines the LSE as "any entity, including a load aggregator or power marketer, that serves end-users within a control area and has been granted the authority or has an obligation pursuant to state or local law, regulation, or franchise to sell electric energy to end-users located within the control area".

An LSE can be considered to be a demand aggregator for the end-users or a middleman capable of setting its own prices to extract profit. Opgrand suggests to classify the LSEs into two distinct types, regulated utilities and unregulated LSEs that have very different incentives with regard to the auction revenue rights (an instrument commonly used in many competitive electricity markets).

LSE buys the energy at the wholesale electricity market and resells it to its customers at a regulated price, thus incurring market risks.

Wholesale electricity markets in their current state cannot rely on energy-only pricing to provide the expected grid reliability, thus regulators through the regional transmission organization also obligate the LSEs to pay for the capacity so that there is enough electricity supply available to support the peak demand.

== Sources ==
- Opgrand, Jeffrey J. (August 2019). "Types of Load-Serving Entities" (PDF). The Role of Auction Revenue Rights in Markets for Financial Transmission Rights (PhD). Purdue University.
