= Dunkelflaute =

Long period of gloomy calm weather

A dunkelflaute of three days in Germany 2023 (wind in light blue and solar in yellow)

In the renewable energy sector, a dunkelflaute (German: [ˈdʊŋkəlˌflaʊtə], lit. 'dark doldrums' or 'dark wind lull', plural dunkelflauten) is a period of time in which little or no energy can be generated with wind and solar power, because there is neither wind nor sunlight. In meteorology, this is known as anticyclonic gloom.

== Meteorology ==
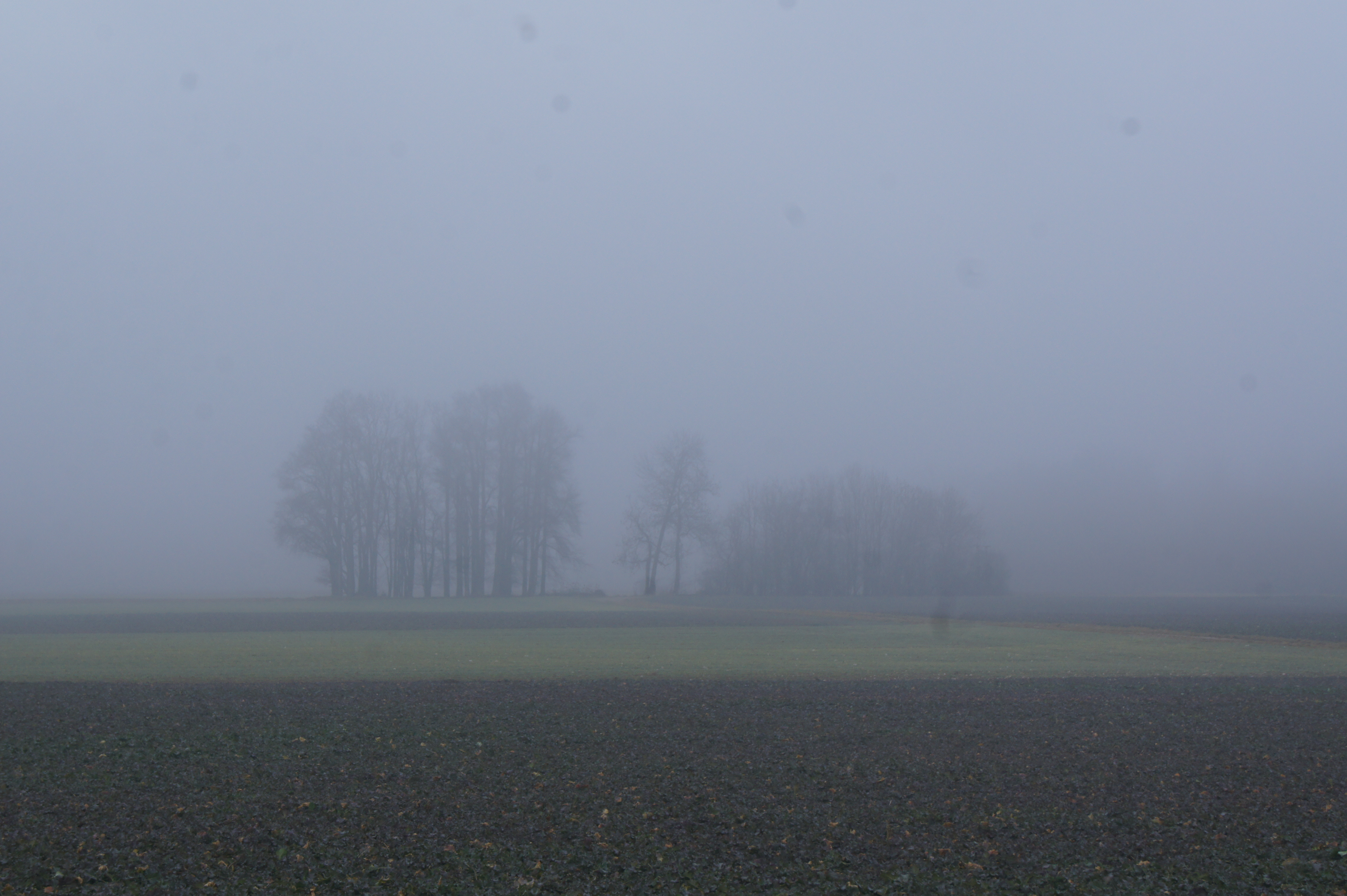
A cloudy and foggy January evening in Austria, one hour before sunset

Unlike a typical anticyclone, dunkelflauten are associated not with clear skies, but with very dense cloud cover (0.7–0.9), consisting of stratus, stratocumulus, and fog. As of 2022 there is no agreed quantitative definition of dunkelflaute. Li et al. define it as wind and solar both below 20% of capacity during a particular 60-minute period. High albedo of low-level stratocumulus clouds in particular – sometimes the cloud base height is just 400 meters – can reduce solar irradiation by half.

In the north of Europe, dunkelflauten originate from a static high-pressure system that causes an extremely weak wind combined with overcast weather with stratus or stratocumulus clouds. There are 2–10 dunkelflaute events per year. Most of these events occur from October to February; typically 50 to 150 hours per year, a single event usually lasts up to 24 hours.

In Japan, on the other hand, dunkelflauten are seen in summer and winter. The former is caused by stationary fronts in early summer and autumn rainy seasons (called Baiu and Akisame, respectively), while the latter is caused by arrivals of south-coast cyclones.

== Renewable energy effects ==
These periods are a big issue in energy infrastructure if a significant amount of electricity is generated by variable renewable energy (VRE) sources, mainly solar and wind power. Dunkelflauten can occur simultaneously over a very large region, but are less correlated between geographically distant regions, so multi-national power grid schemes can be helpful. Events that last more than two days over most of Europe happen about once every five years. To ensure power during such periods flexible energy sources may be used, energy may be imported, and demand may be adjusted.

For alternative energy sources, countries use fossil fuels (coal, oil and natural gas), hydroelectricity or nuclear power and, less often, energy storage to prevent power outages. Long-term solutions include designing electricity markets to incentivise clean power which is available when needed. A group of countries is following on from Mission Innovation to work together to solve the problem in a clean, low-carbon way by 2030, including looking into carbon capture and storage and the hydrogen economy as possible parts of the solution.

=== Droughts ===
By analogy with hydrological droughts, long used in planning for hydroelectricity, the researchers of the future VRE-intensive power grids in the 2020s started using the term variable renewable energy drought (VRE drought or simply power drought) that is nearly synonymous to the dunkelflaute. Unlike the dunkelflaute, the drought can be a series of isolated adverse events, the most severe effects are forecasted are of this series type, and the planning for resource adequacy thus should span multiple years. Kittel et al. indicate the years 1996–1997 as particularly bad example of the VRE drought, they call for an additional EU-wide energy storage of 50 to 170 TWh (on top of current projections) to accommodate a series of events of this magnitude.

== See also ==
- Duck curve
- Variable renewable energy

== Sources ==
- Kittel, Martin; Roth, Alexander; Schill, Wolf-Peter (2024). "Variable renewable energy droughts ("Dunkelflauten") and power sector implications" (PDF). DIW Berlin.
- Kittel, Martin; Schill, Wolf-Peter (2024). "Measuring the Dunkelflaute: How (Not) to analyze variable renewable energy shortage". Environmental Research: Energy. 1 (3): 035007. arXiv:2402.06758. Bibcode:2024EREne...135007K. doi:10.1088/2753-3751/ad6dfc.
- Li, Bowen; Basu, Sukanta; Watson, Simon J.; Russchenberg, Herman W. J. (11 October 2021). "A Brief Climatology of Dunkelflaute Events over and Surrounding the North and Baltic Sea Areas" (PDF). Energies. 14 (20): 6508. doi:10.3390/en14206508. eISSN 1996-1073.
- Sahoo, Subrat; Timmann, Pascal (2023). "Energy Storage Technologies for Modern Power Systems: A Detailed Analysis of Functionalities, Potentials, and Impacts" (PDF). IEEE Access. 11: 49689–49729. Bibcode:2023IEEEA..1149689S. doi:10.1109/ACCESS.2023.3274504. ISSN 2169-3536.
- Somani, Abhishek; Barrett, Emily; Zhou, Zhi; Chan, Gavin; Middleton, Luke; Tarel, Guillaume; Campbell, Allison; Botterud, Audun; Bhatnagar, Dhruv; Beckitt, Alex; O'Reilley, Christopher; Zhu, Yanyan; Sun, Xueqing (1 May 2024). An Assessment of Resource Drought Events as Indicators for Long-Duration Energy Storage Needs (Report). doi:10.2172/2349123. OSTI 2349123.
