= Asui =

Asui may refer to:

- Tsuyu Asui, a fictional character in the manga and anime series My Hero Academia
- ASUI (Average Service Unavailability Index), a reliability index commonly used by electric power utilities
