= NQC =

NQC may refer to:

- Not Quite C, a programming language
- National Quartet Convention, of musicians in Louisville, Kentucky, US
- North Queensland Cowboys, Australian rugby league team
- North Queensland Company of the Queensland University Regiment
- Net qualifying capacity, power of the electrical generation plant that can be relied on
