= ASUI =

Reliability index

The Average Service Unavailability Index (ASUI) is a reliability index commonly used by electric power utilities. It is calculated as

$\mbox{ASUI} = \frac{\sum{U_i N_i}}{\sum{N_i} \times 8760} = 1- \mbox{ASAI}$

where $N_i$ is the number of customers and $U_i$ is the annual outage time (in hours) for location $i$. ASUI can be represented in relation to SAIDI (where annual SAIDI is given in hours) as

$\mbox{ASUI} = \frac{\mbox{SAIDI}}{8760}$
