= CAIFI =

Reliability index used for electric power systems

The Customer Average Interruption Frequency Index (CAIFI) is a popular reliability index used in the reliability analysis of an electric power system. It is designed to show trends in customers interrupted and helps to show the number of customers affected out of the whole customer base.

$\mbox{CAIFI} = \frac{\mbox{Total Number of Customer Interruptions}}{\mbox{Number of Distinct Customers Interrupted}}$
