= Loss of load =

Term in electrical engineering

Loss of load in an electrical grid is a term used to describe the situation when the available generation capacity is less than the system load. Multiple probabilistic reliability indices for the generation systems are using loss of load in their definitions, with the more popular being Loss of Load Probability (LOLP) that characterizes a probability of a loss of load occurring within a year. Loss of load events are calculated before the mitigating actions (purchasing electricity from other systems, load shedding) are taken, so a loss of load does not necessarily cause a blackout.

The concept of probabilistic assessment of power resource adequacy dates back to the 1930s. A foundational paper was published by Calabrese in 1947, which introduced a method to calculate the expected number of days when peak daily electricity demand would exceed the available generating capacity. This paper also started the tradition of describing the reliability metrics with multiple different, and loose, phrases like “loss of load duration” and “expected total number of days of loss of load".

== Loss-of-load-based reliability indices ==
Multiple reliability indices for the electrical generation are based on the loss of load being observed/calculated over a long interval (one or multiple years) in relatively small increments (an hour or a day). The total number of increments inside the long interval is designated as $N$ (e.g., for a yearlong interval $N=365$ if the increment is a day, $N=8760$ if the increment is an hour):

- Loss of load probability (LOLP) is a probability of an occurrence of an increment with a loss of load condition. LOLP can also be considered as a probability of involuntary load shedding;
- Loss of load expectation (LOLE) is the total duration of increments when the loss of load is expected to occur, ${LOLE} = {LOLP} \cdot N$. Frequently LOLE is specified in days, if the increment is an hour, not a day, a term loss of load hours (LOLH) is sometimes used. Since LOLE uses the daily peak value for the whole day, LOLH (that uses different peak values for each hour) cannot be obtained by simply multiplying LOLE by 24; although in practice the relationship is close to linear, the coefficients vary from network to network;
- Loss of load events (LOLEV) a.k.a. loss of load frequency (LOLF) is the number of loss of load events within the interval (an event can occupy several contiguous increments);
- Loss of load duration (LOLD) characterizes the average duration of a loss of load event: ${LOLD} = \frac {LOLE} {LOLF}$

== One-day-in-ten-years criterion ==
A typically accepted design goal for $LOLE$ is 0.1 day per year ("one-day-in-ten-years criterion" a.k.a. "1 in 10"), corresponding to ${LOLP} = \frac {1} {10 \cdot 365} \approx 0.000274$. In the US, the threshold is set by the regional entities, like Northeast Power Coordinating Council:

resources will be planned in such a manner that ... the probability of disconnecting non-interruptible customers will be no more than once in ten years

— NPCC criteria on generation adequacy

The "1 in 10" value was gradually accepted as the norm in the 1960s.

== See also ==
- Value of lost load

== Sources ==
- "Loss of Load Probability: Application to Montana" (PDF). Ascend Analytics. 2019. Archived from the original (PDF) on 25 Jun 2021.
- David Elmakias, ed. (7 July 2008). New Computational Methods in Power System Reliability. Springer Science & Business Media. p. 174. ISBN 978-3-540-77810-3. OCLC 1050955963.
- Arteconi, Alessia; Bruninx, Kenneth (7 February 2018). "Energy Reliability and Management". Comprehensive Energy Systems. Vol. 5. Elsevier. p. 140. ISBN 978-0-12-814925-6. OCLC 1027476919.
- Meier, Alexandra von (30 June 2006). Electric Power Systems: A Conceptual Introduction. John Wiley & Sons. p. 230. ISBN 978-0-470-03640-2. OCLC 1039149555.
- Wang, Xi-Fan; Song, Yonghua; Irving, Malcolm (7 June 2010). Modern Power Systems Analysis. Springer Science & Business Media. p. 151. ISBN 978-0-387-72853-7. OCLC 1012499302.
- Ela, Erik; Milligan, Michael; Bloom, Aaron; Botterud, Audun; Townsend, Aaron; Levin, Todd (2018). "Long-Term Resource Adequacy, Long-Term Flexibility Requirements, and Revenue Sufficiency". Studies in Systems, Decision and Control. Vol. 144. Springer International Publishing. pp. 129–164. doi:10.1007/978-3-319-74263-2_6. eISSN 2198-4190. ISBN 978-3-319-74261-8. ISSN 2198-4182.
- "Probabilistic Adequacy and Measures: Technical Reference Report" (PDF). NERC. February 2018. p. 13.
- Ibanez, Eduardo; Milligan, Michael (July 2014), "Comparing resource adequacy metrics and their influence on capacity value" (PDF), 2014 International Conference on Probabilistic Methods Applied to Power Systems (PMAPS), IEEE, pp. 1–6, doi:10.1109/PMAPS.2014.6960610, hdl:11556/8706, ISBN 978-1-4799-3561-1, OSTI 1127287, S2CID 3135204
- Billinton, Roy; Huang, Dange (June 2006), "Basic Concepts in Generating Capacity Adequacy Evaluation", 2006 International Conference on Probabilistic Methods Applied to Power Systems, IEEE, pp. 1–6, doi:10.1109/PMAPS.2006.360431, ISBN 978-91-7178-585-5, S2CID 25841586
- Tezak, Christine (June 24, 2005). Resource Adequacy - Alphabet Soup! (PDF). Stanford Washington Research Group. Archived from the original (PDF) on March 15, 2023.
- Duarte, Yorlandys Salgado; Serpa, Alfredo del Castillo (2016). "Assessment of the Reliability of Electrical Power Systems". In Antônio José da Silva Neto; Orestes Llanes Santiago; Geraldo Nunes Silva (eds.). Mathematical Modeling and Computational Intelligence in Engineering Applications. Springer. doi:10.1007/978-3-319-38869-4_11. ISBN 978-3-319-38868-7.
- Stephen, Gord; Tindemans, Simon H.; Fazio, John; Dent, Chris; Acevedo, Armando Figueroa; Bagen, Bagen; Crawford, Alex; Klaube, Andreas; Logan, Douglas; Burke, Daniel (2022-06-12). "Clarifying the Interpretation and Use of the LOLE Resource Adequacy Metric" (PDF). 2022 17th International Conference on Probabilistic Methods Applied to Power Systems (PMAPS). IEEE. pp. 1–4. doi:10.1109/PMAPS53380.2022.9810615. hdl:20.500.11820/9999b3ec-36d5-4ec3-9672-c49889d10f81. ISBN 978-1-6654-1211-7.
- Calabrese, Giuseppe (1947). "Generating Reserve Capacity Determined by the Probability Method". Transactions of the American Institute of Electrical Engineers. 66 (1): 1439–1450. doi:10.1109/T-AIEE.1947.5059596. ISSN 0096-3860.
- EPRI (2021-10-08). "Metrics Explainers". EPRI Micro Sites. Electric Power Research Institute.
