= Load shedding =

Electrical distribution safety technique

Load shedding (LS), often spelled loadshedding, is a protective method of emergency power control where, during a large imbalance between supply and demand, the demand (load) is intentionally disconnected ("shed") so that the available electricity supply within a safe timeframe can meet the remaining demand, thereby preventing a cascading collapse of the power grid.

Load shedding is activated when the line frequency becomes too low (under-frequency load shedding, UFLS) or the line voltage is below the specified level (under-voltage load shedding, UVLS). The very act of disconnecting the load introduces yet another disturbance into the grid, so the selection of the bus about to be shed is chosen based on the bus distance from the contingency location as well as economic considerations. The shedding can be shared via "rolling blackouts" or "rolling brownouts" (the typical situation, especially for UFLS: multiple areas of the grid shed the load in cooperative manner) or targeted via a "targeted blackout" (the load shedding is concentrated in a particular area). Typically the shedding is performed automatically in multiple stages, each with a pre-programmed threshold and the load amount to shed.

== Under-frequency load shedding (UFLS) ==
A UFLS scheme sheds predetermined amounts of load when the system frequency drops below specific thresholds. UFLS typically has short time delays, around 0.2 seconds. The UFLS schemes are most common and often represent a shared shedding paradigm.

== Under-voltage load shedding (UVLS) ==
A UVLS scheme is used to protect against excessive voltage decline by shedding load when voltage falls below specified thresholds. Time delays in UVLS are generally longer, typically above 3 seconds to prevent false tripping. Some research suggests using a slope-permissive UVLS design to shed load earlier based on predicted voltage drops. UVLS can be employed in targeted load shedding approaches.

By the end of the 20th century, the main cause of blackouts in North America had switched from underfrequency to voltage collapse.

== See also ==
- Demand response
- South African energy crisis

== Sources ==
- Bevrani, Hassan; Watanabe, Masayuki; Mitani, Yasunori (2014-05-30). "Wide‐Area Measurement‐Based Emergency Control". Power System Monitoring and Control. Wiley. pp. 158–185. doi:10.1002/9781118852422.ch08. ISBN 978-1-118-45069-7.
- Bevrani, Hassan; Hiyama, Takashi (2017-12-19). Intelligent Automatic Generation Control. CRC Press. ISBN 978-1-4398-4954-5.
- Mozina, Charles J. (2007). 2007 60th Annual Conference for Protective Relay Engineers (PDF). doi:10.1109/CPRE.2007.359889.
