= CAIDI =

Reliability index used by electric power utilities

The Customer Average Interruption Duration Index (CAIDI) is a reliability index commonly used by electric power utilities. It is related to SAIDI and SAIFI, and is calculated as

$\mbox{CAIDI} = \frac{\sum{U_i N_i}}{\sum{\lambda_i N_i}}$

where $\lambda_i$ is the failure rate, $N_i$ is the number of customers, and $U_i$ is the annual outage time for location $i$. In other words,

$\mbox{CAIDI} = \frac{\mbox{sum of all customer interruption durations}}{\mbox{total number of customer interruptions}} = \frac{\mbox{SAIDI}}{\mbox{SAIFI}}$

CAIDI gives the average outage duration that any given customer would experience. CAIDI can also be viewed as the average restoration time.

CAIDI is measured in units of time, often minutes or hours. It is usually measured over the course of a year, and according to IEEE Standard 1366-1998 the median value for North American utilities is approximately 1.36 hours.
