= Dispatchable generation =

Sources of electricity that can be used on demand

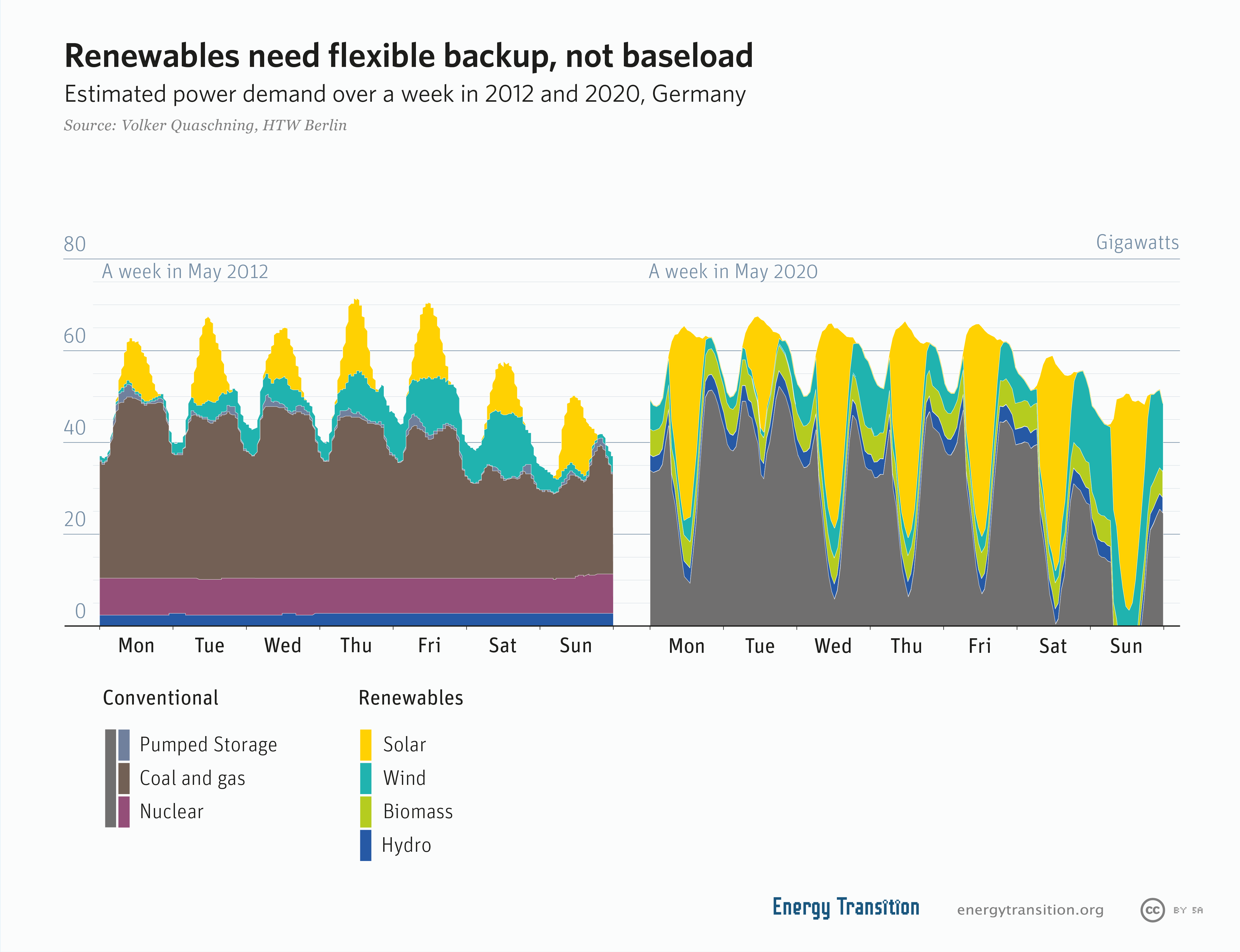
Grids with high penetration of renewable energy sources generally need dispatchable generation rather than baseload generation

Dispatchable generation refers to sources of electricity that can be programmed on demand at the request of power grid operators, according to market needs. Dispatchable generators may adjust their power output according to a request.

Conventional power sources like gas, coal and some nuclear may be considered dispatchable to varying degrees, while most renewable energy sources are not. Some coal and nuclear power plants can be considered non-dispatchable, due to their slow shutdown and startup times, depending on the specific technology.

Inverter-based intermittent resources like wind and solar power are quickly adjustable only to reduce their output (curtailment) relative to their production limit at any given time, which is given by the availability of the resource (like sun or wind). For this reason, they are not considered dispatchable. However, these non-dispatchable power sources can be made effectively dispatachable by combining them with energy storage such as battery energy storage systems. Other types of renewable energy can be dispatchable without separate energy storage. These include hydroelectric, biomass, geothermal and solar thermal.

== Startup time ==
Dispatchable plants have varying startup times, depending on the technology used and time elapsed after the previous operation. For example, "hot startup" can be performed a few hours after a preceding shutdown, while "cold startup" is performed after a few days of inoperation.

The fastest plants to dispatch are grid batteries which can dispatch in milliseconds. Hydroelectric power plants can often dispatch in tens of seconds to minutes, and natural gas power plants can generally dispatch in tens of minutes.

For example, the 1,728 MW Dinorwig pumped storage power plant can reach full output in 16 seconds, while the 410.9 MW simple-cycle gas turbine at Lincoln Combustion Turbine Station takes 10 minutes to start up and reach full output.

Gas turbine (Brayton cycle) thermal plants require around 15–30 minutes to startup. Coal thermal plants based on steam turbines (Rankine cycle) are dispatchable sources that require hours to startup.

The combined cycle power plants consist of few stages with varying startup times with more than 8 hours required to get to full power from cold state:

- the gas turbine can start in 15–30 minutes;
- the steam turbine (ST) heating process takes from 1 hour (for hot startup) to 6 hours (for cold startup);
- ST load increase takes additional 20 minutes (if "hot") to 2 hours ("cold").

Nuclear power plants have the longest startup times of few days for the cold startup (less than a week). A typical boiling water reactor goes through the following stages:

- establishment of a chain reaction (up to 6 hours);
- getting to nominal temperature and pressure in the reactor (12 hours);
- warming up the steam generation (12 hours);
- increasing the load (2–3 days).

== Benefits ==
The primary benefits of dispatchable power plants include:

- providing spinning reserve (frequency control)
- balancing the electric power system (load following)
- optimizing economic generation dispatch (merit order)
- contributing to clearing grid congestion (redispatch)

These capabilities of dispatchable generators allow:

- Load matching – slow changes in power demand between, for example, night and day, require changes in supply too, as the system needs to be balanced at all times (see also Electricity).
- Peak matching – short periods of time during which demand exceeds the output of load matching plants; generation capable of satisfying these peaks in demand is implemented through quick deployment of dispatchable sources.
- Lead-in times – periods during which an alternative source is employed to supplement the lead time required by large coal or natural gas fueled plants to reach full output; these alternative power sources can be deployed in a matter of seconds or minutes to adapt to rapid shocks in demand or supply that cannot be satisfied by peak matching generators.
- Frequency regulation or intermittent power sources – changes in the electricity output sent into the system may change quality and stability of the transmission system itself because of a change in the frequency of electricity transmitted; renewable sources such as wind and solar are intermittent and need flexible power sources to smooth out their changes in energy production.
- Backup for base-load generators – Nuclear power plants, for example, are equipped with nuclear reactor safety systems that can stop the generation of electricity in less than a second in case of emergency.

== Alternative classification ==
A 2018 study suggested a new classification of energy generation sources, which accounts for fast increase in penetration of variable renewable energy sources, which result in high energy prices during periods of low availability:

- "Fuel saving" variable renewable energy, which have near zero variable costs and zero fuel costs by using power of wind, Sun and run-of-river hydropower. With large share of these sources, "capacity needs are driven by periods with low VRE availability" and therefore their proposed role is to replace other high-variable cost sources at periods when they are available.
- "Fast-burst" are energy sources that can be instantly dispatched during periods of high demand and high energy prices, but are poorly performing for long term continuous operations. These include energy storage (batteries), flexible demand and demand response.
- "Firm" low-carbon sources, which provide stable energy supply during all seasons and during periods up to weeks or months, and include nuclear power, hydro plants with large reservoirs, fossil fuels with carbon capture, geothermal and biofuels.

== See also ==
- Peaking power plant
- Load following power plant
- Intermittent energy source

== Sources ==
- Ivanova, Polina; Sauhats, Antans; Linkevics, Olegs (2016). Towards optimization of combined cycle power plants' start-ups and shut-down. IEEE. doi:10.1109/RTUCON.2016.7763081. ISBN 978-1-5090-3731-5.
- Li, Yifei (2021). Characterization of the reaction time of different power plants (PDF) (M.Sc. thesis). Technische Hochschule Ingolstadt.
