= SAIFI =

Measure of frequency of electric power interruptions

The System Average Interruption Frequency Index (SAIFI) is commonly used as a reliability index by electric power utilities. This index measures the average number of times that a system customer experiences an outage during the year or during a given time period.

SAIFI is normally calculated on either yearly or monthly basis. SAIFI is calculated as:

$\mbox{SAIFI} = \frac{\sum{\lambda_i N_i}}{\sum{N_i}}$

where $\lambda_i$ is the failure rate and $N_i$ is the number of customers for location $i$. In other words,

$\mbox{SAIFI} = \frac{\mbox{total number of customer interruptions}}{\mbox{total number of customers served}}$

Many factors cause power interruptions, including weather, vegetation patterns, and utility practices. Utilities can report interruption duration values with major events (such as snowstorms or hurricanes), without major events, or both.

SAIFI is measured in units of interruptions per customer.

According to IEEE Standard 1366-1998 the median value for North American utilities is approximately 1.10 interruptions per customer.

== Sources ==
- IEEE Guide for Electric Power Distribution Reliability Indices, IEEE 1366, 2012, doi:10.1109/IEEESTD.2012.6209381, ISBN 978-0-7381-7275-0
