= Firm service =

Firm services, also called uninterruptible services, are services, such as electricity (firm power) and natural gas supplies, that are intended to be available at all times during a period covered by an agreement. Also, the service is not subject to a prior claim from another customer and receives the same priority as any other firm service. Conditional firm service is similar to firm service in that it is reserved and has priority over interruptible service. However, it can have restrictions, such as times when it would be curtailed before firm service but after interruptible service. The cost per unit with this service is called a firm rate or uninterruptible rate.

The opposite of firm service is non-firm service, also called interruptible service or as-available service. The cost per unit for this service is called a non-firm rate or interruptible rate. The interruptible load is the portion of a utility's load that comes from customers with interruptible service.

Firm service cannot be interrupted during adverse conditions, such as periods of high demand. However, firm service may also refer to service that is covered by a long-term contract, such as a year or more. There are extreme cases when firm services may be interrupted, such as emergencies and when system reliability is threatened. Services to homes and small businesses are usually firm. Some businesses that cannot afford interruptions also have firm service. Businesses that can afford to have services interrupted or that can significantly reduce their consumption when notified by the provider can get better rates by having non-firm service. Customers that have non-firm service may have a low level or baseline firm service that is guaranteed so that they do not have to shut down completely. Firm and non-firm service is also available for companies that rent or lease pipeline or electrical transmission capacity.

Firm service for natural gas pipelines and electrical transmission lines often include two charges. The first is a reservation charge related to how much capacity the customer reserves. This charge is paid regardless of how much capacity is actually used. The second charge is based on how much capacity is used. Interruptible rates are volumetric, being based only on the volume of gas or electricity delivered.

== See also ==
- Public utility

== Sources ==
- Energy Information Administration - Natural Gas Glossary
- Public Service Commission of Wisconsin - Glossary
- Federal Energy Regulatory Commission - Reliability
- Federal Energy Regulatory Commission -Docket No. RP04-328-001
- the California Public Utilities Commission - Wong Comment Dec Gas Structure
- California Energy Commission - Rate Structures for Customers with Onsite Generation
