= SAIDI =

Reliability index used by electric power utilities

The system average interruption duration index (SAIDI) is commonly used as a reliability index by electric power utilities. SAIDI is the average cumulative outage duration for each customer served, and is calculated as:

$$\mbox{SAIDI} = \frac{\sum{U_i N_i}}{N_T}$$

where $N_i$ is the number of customers and $U_i$ is the annual outage time for location $i$, and $N_T$ is the total number of customers served. In other words,

$$\mbox{SAIDI} = \frac{\mbox{sum of all customer interruption durations}}{\mbox{total number of customers served}}$$

SAIDI is measured in units of time, often minutes or hours; it is usually measured over the course of a year. According to IEEE Standard 1366–1998, the median value for North American utilities is approximately 1.50 hours. According to the U.S. Energy Information Administration annual electric power industry report, it is 2.0 hours, rising to the range of 3.5 to 8 hours, when "major events" are included.

== Comparison of SAIDI by country ==
The following is a table of SAIDI for different countries, calculated using the methodology in the World Bank's Doing Business 2016-2020 studies:

Country	Population (million) in 2020	SAIDI (hours) in 2019	SAIDI (hours) in 2020
Austria	8.9	0.7	0.6
Belgium	11.5	0.7	0.4
Croatia	4.0	4.8	3.3
Cyprus	1.2	0.3	0.6
Czechia	10.7	0.5	0.5
Denmark	5.8	0.5	0.5
Estonia	1.3	0.3	0.3
Finland	5.5	0.6	0.2
France	67.6	0.2	0.4
Germany	83.2	0.2	0.3
Greece	10.7	1.9	1.6
Hungary	9.8	2.8	2.6
Ireland	5.0	0.3	0.8
Italy	59.4	0.5	1.3
Latvia	1.9	1.0	1.0
Lithuania	2.8	0.4	0.4
Luxembourg	0.6	0.4	0.4
Malta	0.5	0.6	0.8
Netherlands	17.4	0.8	0.8
Norway	5.4	0.7	1.5
Poland	37.9	1.3	1.1
Portugal	10.3	0.6	0.5
Romania	19.3	2.1	3.1
Slovakia	5.5	1.0	0.9
Slovenia	2.1	0.6	0.1
Spain	47.4	0.5	0.5
Sweden	10.4	0.6	0.6
Switzerland	8.6	0.2	0.2
United Kingdom	67.1	0.3	0.3
United States	331.5	1.2	1.3
