= Power system reduction =

Simplifying model for electrical grids

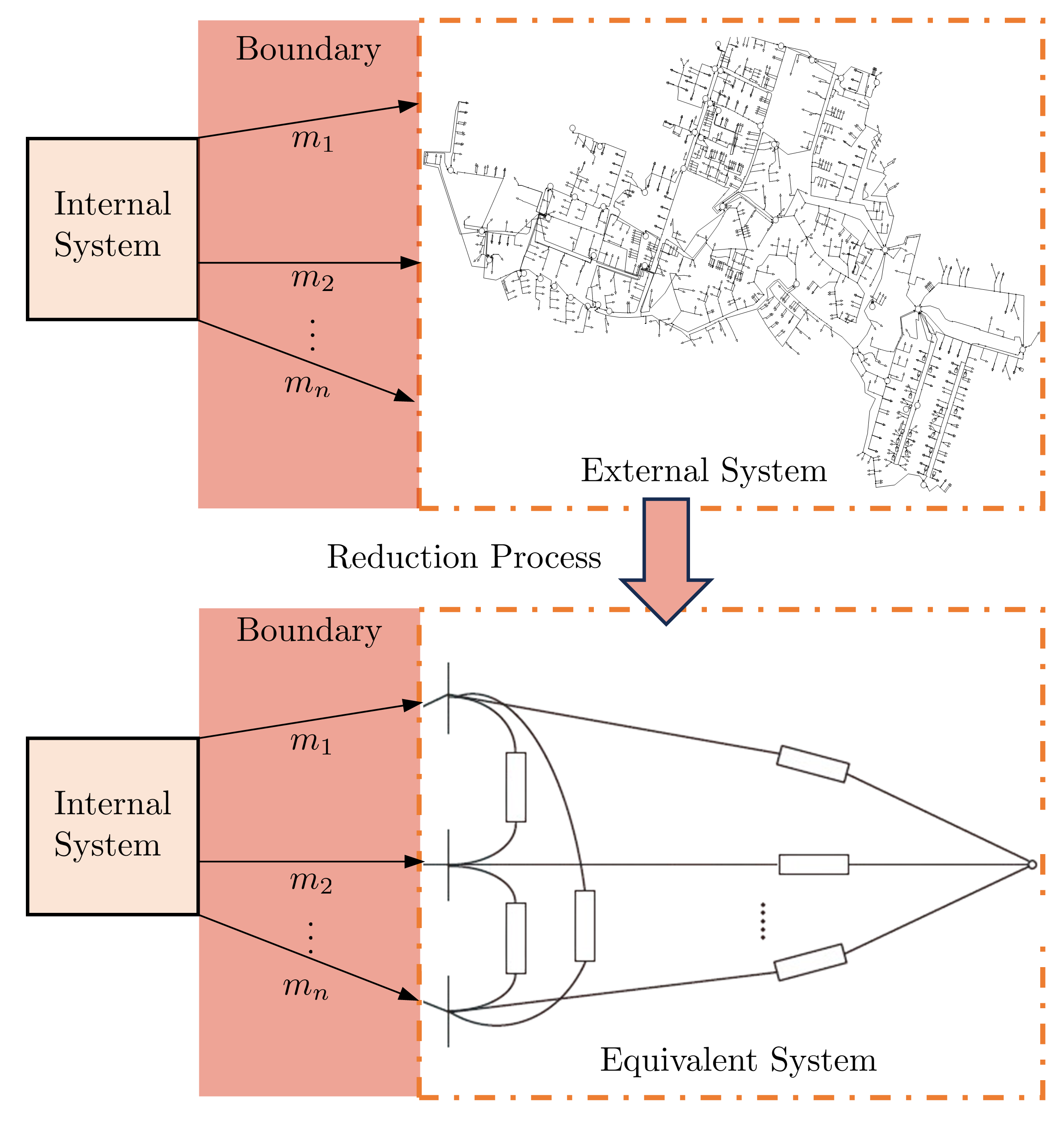
A complex distribution network reduced to a simplified equivalent system

Power system reduction is the process of simplifying a large and complex electrical grid by replacing less critical parts of the system with reduced equivalent models, while accurately representing the portion of the system under study. This approach is widely used in time-domain and stability analyses, especially in modern power grids that include a high number of inverter-based resources (IBRs). Simulating the full detail of such systems is often computationally demanding, as distribution networks may contain thousands of elements across multiple feeders and substations. By applying network reduction techniques, transmission system operators can significantly reduce simulation time while preserving the essential dynamic and static behavior needed for accurate analysis.

== Classification of reduction techniques ==
Power system reduction techniques can be grouped into two main categories: static and dynamic, each with distinct goals and applications.

=== Static reduction ===
These methods simplify the system based on steady state assumptions, mainly used in planning and power-flow studies:

- Kron reduction is a matrix-based method that eliminates internal nodes from the network by applying the Schur complement to the admittance matrix.
- Ward reduction, an extension of Kron reduction, reduces the external system to its boundary buses using power transfer distribution factors. The effects of eliminated loads and generators are represented as equivalent sources at these boundary buses.
- Radial Equivalent Independent (REI) reduction aggregates all external loads and generators into a fictitious node through a passive radial network, which connects to a zero-potential star point. The method uses a zero-power balance technique to maintain current balance.

=== Dynamic reduction ===
Dynamic reduction techniques aim to preserve the transient or oscillatory behavior of the system. They are used in transient studies such as voltage stability and frequency stability analysis. These techniques are further classified into model-based and measurement-based methods.

==== Model-based techniques ====
Model-based dynamic reduction techniques rely on mathematical representations of power system components, such as generators, loads, and transmission lines, to create simplified but behaviorally accurate equivalents. These methods are typically applied when full knowledge of system topology and parameters is available. They are categorized into low-frequency and high-frequency equivalents based on the time-scale and phenomena of interest.

- Low-frequency equivalents are mainly used in electromechanical transient studies, such as rotor angle or frequency stability analysis. In some cases, they are also applied in electromagnetic transient (EMT) studies when the external system is electrically far from the study system. These techniques approximate the transmission system with constant impedances and neglect fast electrical transients associated with synchronous generators and inverter-based generators.
  - Singular perturbation analysis separates the fast and slow dynamics of a power system using time-scale decomposition. It is particularly suitable for reducing generator models by eliminating fast transients.
  - Modal analysis identifies the dominant dynamic behaviors of a power system by analyzing the eigenvalues and eigenvectors of its linearized dynamic matrix. This method decomposes the system into individual modes, each associated with a specific frequency and damping ratio. The modes are ranked by dynamic significance, typically by magnitude or energy contribution, and only the most influential low-frequency modes are retained. Weaker modes that contribute minimally to the system's overall behavior are discarded, resulting in a reduced-order model that preserves essential oscillatory characteristics. Techniques such as dominance indices can be used to guide the selection of significant modes in practical applications.
  - Coherency-based reduction aggregates generators or machines that exhibit similar dynamic behavior during system disturbances. When a disturbance such as a fault occurs, some generators respond in closely aligned trajectories, swinging together in frequency and phase. These coherent generators can be grouped and replaced with a single equivalent machine, simplifying the system without sacrificing key dynamic properties. This method is particularly useful in regional and inter-area studies, where only the broad swing dynamics between areas are of interest. For example, in Kundur's two-area test system, a fault causes the frequency deviation signals of four generator terminal buses to split into two distinct groups. These coherent groups represent regional clusters of machines responding in synchrony to the disturbance. The coherency-based reduction process typically involves three main steps. First, coherent groups of generators are identified based on their dynamic response, often through time-domain simulations or modal analysis. Second, the generator buses within each group are reduced to a single equivalent node. Finally, equivalent generator parameters, such as inertia and damping, are derived for the aggregated machine.
- High-frequency equivalents are designed to capture fast transients such as electromagnetic wave propagation, fault dynamics, and converter switching behavior. These models are used in EMT studies, often for systems with power electronics or detailed protection schemes.
  - Frequency-dependent network equivalents (FDNEs) represent the external network's impedance across a wide frequency range using rational function fitting. FDNEs are typically constructed from frequency sweep data and are implemented using techniques like vector fitting. They enable accurate modeling of the network's high-frequency response without including every physical component.
  - Two-layer network equivalents combine detailed high-frequency and simplified low-frequency models to represent the external system in EMT simulations. The surface layer captures fast transients using frequency-dependent line models, while the deep layer models slower dynamics with a reduced-order equivalent. This approach balances accuracy and computational efficiency by preserving critical dynamic behavior near the system boundary while simplifying distant network response.

==== Measurement-based techniques ====
Measurement-based techniques create dynamic equivalents using observed or simulated input-to-output data. They are useful when system models are not fully available, such as for external areas or when using phasor measurement unit (PMU) data. These methods rely on active and reactive power exchange responses during voltage disturbances. The disturbances can come from real events or be generated in simulations. Measurement-based techniques are grouped into gray-box and black-box approaches. In black-box methods, the system section is treated as a black box, meaning no internal structural information is known; only external behavior is modeled. In contrast, gray-box methods incorporate simplified power system models, and their parameters are estimated through system identification techniques.

===== Gray-box methods =====
- Clustering-based methods group components (typically buses or generators) with similar dynamic responses to disturbances. The clusters are then replaced with representative aggregated models. Examples include:
  - The netting approach is one of the simplest and most widely used techniques for dynamic reduction. It involves combining all generators, loads, and converters within a defined boundary (such as a substation or a distribution feeder) into a single equivalent model. This aggregated unit reflects the net active and reactive power, as well as the overall inertia and damping characteristics of the internal elements.
  - The technology-control-clustered approach (TCA) groups components based on shared technology types, control strategies, and dynamic response characteristics. It is particularly effective in active distribution networks with a mix of synchronous generators and inverter-based resources. Each cluster is then replaced by a representative equivalent model that captures its aggregate dynamic behavior. TCA offers a balance between modeling detail and computational efficiency, especially in systems with partially known topology but available disturbance-response data.
- Generic model-based methods use predefined templates of power system elements, such as ZIP load models and induction motor models, to represent the dynamic behavior of aggregated loads or generation. These models may also include extensions like composite generation blocks or exponential recovery models to better reflect system response. The model parameters, including control-related values, are estimated using system identification techniques based on input data such as voltage, frequency, and power time series. This approach offers a balance between physical interpretability and practical applicability, especially when full system models are unavailable.

===== Black-box methods =====
- Artificial neural network (ANN) methods are the most common black-box approach. They derive dynamic equivalents through training, with the sole objective of mapping input data sets to the corresponding output data sets so that the model output matches the actual system response. The input data typically includes measurable boundary conditions, such as voltage magnitude, active and reactive power exchanges, and frequency variations, collected from simulated events. Commonly, ANN models used for power system equivalents are multilayer perceptrons trained via backpropagation, allowing accurate representation of complex nonlinear behaviors without explicit internal parameters.
- Autoregressive moving-average (ARMA) models are statistical models that represent stationary time series as a combination of autoregressive (AR) and moving average (MA) terms. ARMA-based equivalents are relatively simple to build and computationally efficient. They work well for systems with near-linear dynamics and are particularly useful when only historical disturbance data is available. However, ARMA models may struggle to accurately represent strongly nonlinear events, such as severe faults or rapid converter actions. To improve accuracy, higher-order or hybrid models (such as ARIMAX, or ARMA combined with neural networks) have been suggested.
- Support vector regression (SVR) is a machine-learning technique that is robust against measurement noise and can model complex nonlinear dynamics even from limited datasets. It constructs a regression model that minimizes error within a defined tolerance (ε-insensitive zone).

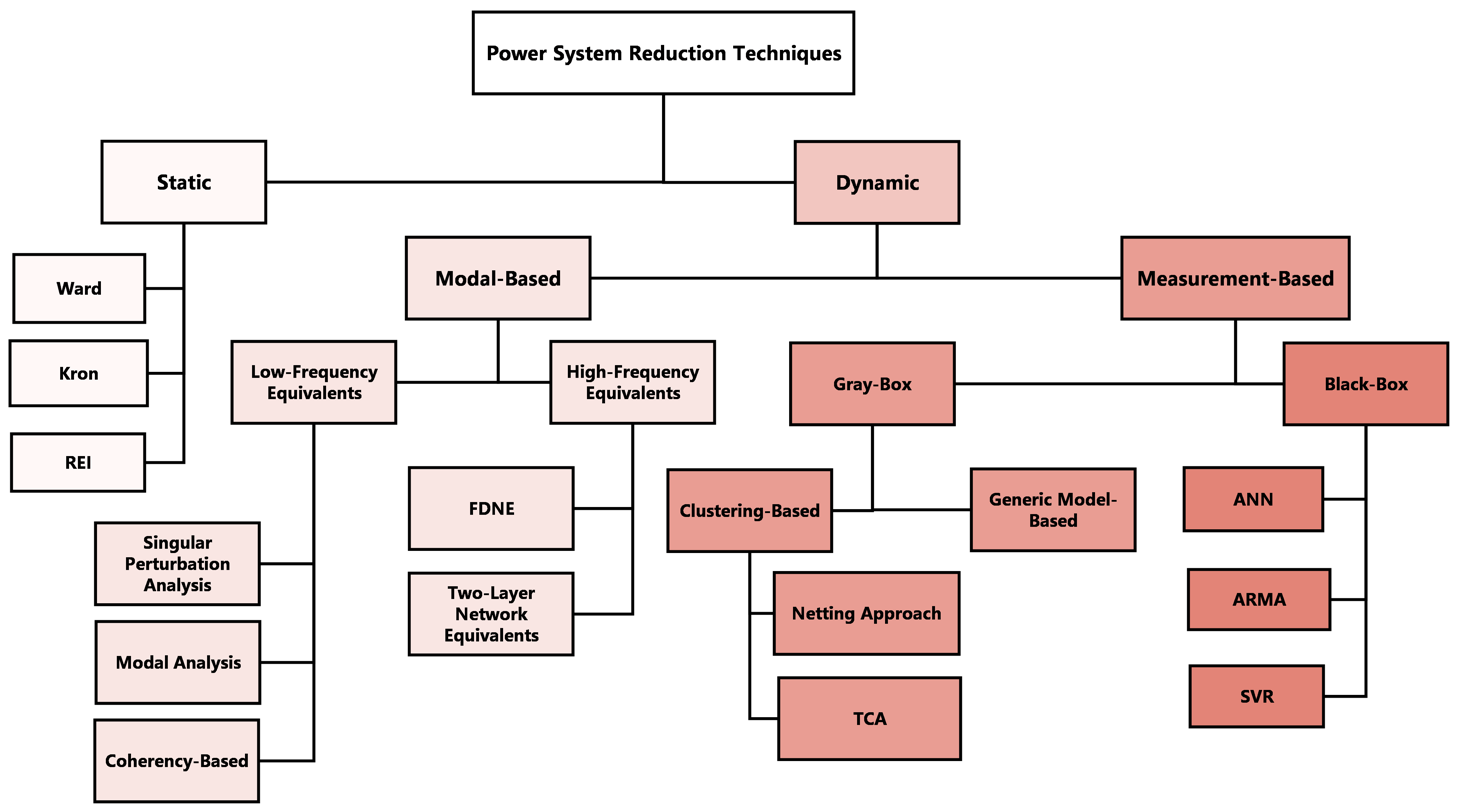
A hierarchical overview of power system reduction techniques

== Applications and software tools for power system reduction ==
=== Applications ===
Power system reduction techniques are essential for analyzing and simulating large-scale power networks efficiently, especially as modern systems become increasingly complex. Contemporary grids incorporate a high share of distributed energy resources (DERs) such as wind and solar, whose intermittency and variability introduce dynamic behaviors not present in traditional systems. Moreover, the growing replacement of large synchronous generators with IBRs has introduced fast-switching dynamics and frequency instability. These changes increase the difficulty of maintaining system stability and managing dynamic interactions within the grid.

Power system reduction has an important role in contingency analysis, where operators simulate short circuit fault scenarios, generator outages, or line trips. Without reduction, such studies on full-scale models could require several minutes to hours per case, which is impractical for operational decision-making. Similarly, in real-time simulation and hardware-in-the-loop (HIL) environments, reduced models are used to represent parts of the network not explicitly simulated, allowing detailed testing of controllers, protection schemes, and inverters within manageable computational limits.

In short-term transient studies, particularly those involving IBRs and converter-dominated subsystems, reduction techniques enable the representation of fast control dynamics while avoiding the need to simulate the entire EMT behavior of a large network. In hybrid simulation environments where electromagnetic transient and phasor-domain RMS models are used together, boundary equivalents allow precise interfacing between detailed and simplified representations. Reduction is also used in long-term planning, such as grid expansion and renewable integration, across broad geographic scales without exhaustive modeling of every subnetwork. Furthermore, in modal and inter-area oscillation analyses, reduced models can preserve key electromechanical modes necessary for system monitoring and control design.

=== Software tools ===
Several commercial and research-oriented power engineering software support static and dynamic power system reduction:

- PSASP (China Electric Power Research Institute): Offers built-in tools for substation-based network reduction and dynamic modeling.
- DIgSILENT PowerFactory (DIgSILENT GmbH): Provides static equivalents (e.g., Ward, REI) and dynamic reduction functions for RMS simulations.
- DYNRED (Powertech Labs): Developed by EPRI in the 1990s to create dynamic equivalents of large power systems; specializes in coherency-based dynamic reduction for transient stability analysis.
- PSS/E (Siemens): Commonly used for planning and operation, supports manual and automated reduction workflows, and integrates with DYNRED.

== See also ==
- Power system simulation
- Kron reduction
- Dynamic simulation
