= Kron reduction =

Power engineering technique

In power engineering, Kron reduction is a method used to reduce or eliminate the desired node without need of repeating the steps like in Gaussian elimination.

It is named after Hungarian American electrical engineer Gabriel Kron.

== Description ==
Kron reduction is a useful tool to eliminate unused nodes in a Y-parameter matrix. For example, three linear elements linked in series with a port at each end may be easily modeled as a 4X4 nodal admittance matrix of Y-parameters, but only the two port nodes normally need to be considered for modeling and simulation. Kron reduction may be used to eliminate the internal nodes, and thereby reducing the 4th order Y-parameter matrix to a 2nd order Y-parameter matrix. The 2nd order Y-parameter matrix is then more easily converted to a Z-parameter matrix or S-parameter matrix when needed.

Matrix operations

Consider a general Y-parameter matrix that may be created from a combination of linear elements constructed such that two internal nodes exist.

$$Y {_4}{_X}{_4} =
\begin{bmatrix}
Y {_1}{_1} & Y {_1}{_2} & Y {_1}{_3} & Y {_1}{_4} \\
Y {_2}{_1} & Y {_2}{_2} & Y {_2}{_3} & Y {_2}{_4} \\
Y {_3}{_1} & Y {_3}{_2} & Y {_3}{_3} & Y {_3}{_4} \\
Y {_4}{_1} & Y {_4}{_2} & Y {_4}{_3} & Y {_4}{_4} \\
\end{bmatrix}$$

While it is possible to use the 4X4 matrix in simulations or to construct a 4X4 S-parameter matrix, is may be simpler to reduce the Y-parameter matrix to a 2X2 by eliminating the two internal nodes through Kron Reduction, and then simulating with a 2X2 matrix and/or converting to a 2X2 S-parameter or Z-Parameter matrix.

$$Y' {_2}{_X}{_2} =
\begin{bmatrix} Y' {_1}{_1} & Y' {_1}{_2} \\ Y' {_2}{_1} & Y' {_2}{_2} \end{bmatrix} \qquad \mathrm{Where\ Y' \ is \ the \ Kron \ Reduced \ Matrix}$$

The process for executing a Kron reduction is as follows:

Select the Kth row/column used to model the undesired internal nodes to be eliminated. Apply the below formula to all other matrix entries that do not reside on the Kth row and column. Then simply remove the Kth row and column of the matrix, which reduces the size of the matrix by one.

Kron Reduction for the Kth row/column of an NxN matrix:

$$\begin{align}
\sum_{i=1}^N\sum_{j=1}^N Y' {_i}{_j} = Y{_i}{_j} - \frac{Y{_i}{_k}Y{_j}{_k}}{Y{_k}{_k}} ,&\qquad for\ i\neq k, ,j\neq k \\
&\qquad \mathrm{Where \ Y' \ is \ The\ Replacement \ Matrix \ Entry} \\
\end{align}$$

Linear elements that are also passive always form a symmetric Y-parameter matrix, that is, $Y {_i}{_j}=Y {_j}{_i}$ in all cases. The number of computations of a Kron reduction may be reduced by taking advantage of this symmetry, as shown ion the equation below.

Kron Reduction for symmetric NxN matrices:

$$\begin{align}
&\sum_{i=1}^N\sum_{j=i}^N Y'{_i}{_j} = Y{_i}{_j} - \frac{Y{_i}{_k}Y{_j}{_k}}{Y{_k}{_k}},\qquad for\ i\neq k,j\neq k \\
&Y{_j}{_i} = Y{_i}{_j}, \qquad for\ i\neq j \\
\end{align}$$

Once all the matrix entries have been modified by the Kron Reduction equation, the Kth row/column may be eliminated, and the matrix order is reduced by one. Repeat for all internal nodes desired to be eliminated

== Simplified theory and derivation ==
The concept behind Kron reduction is quite simple. Y-parameters are measured using nodes shorted to ground, but unused nodes, that is nodes without ports, are not necessarily grounded, and their state is not directly known to the outside. Therefore, the Y-parameter matrix of the full network does not adequately describe the Y-parameter of the network being modeled, and contains extraneous entries if some nodes do not have ports.

Consider the case of two lumped elements of equal value in series, two resistors of equal resistance for example. If both resistors have an admittance of $Y_R$, and the series network has an admittance of $Y_R/2$. The full admittance matrix that accounts for all three nodes in the network would look like below, using standard Y-parameter matrix construction techniques:

$$Y_{FULL} =
\begin{bmatrix} 0 & -Y_R & Y_R \\ -Y_R & 2Y_R & -Y_R \\ Y_R & -Y_R & 0 \end{bmatrix}$$

However, it is easily observed that the two resistors in series, each with an assigned admittance of Y, has a net admittance of $Y_R/2$, and since resistors do not leak current to ground, that the network Y12 is equal and opposite to YR11, that is YR12 = -YR11. The 2 port network without the middle node can be created by inspection and is shown below:

$$Y_{PORTS} =
\begin{bmatrix} -Y_R/2 & Y_R/2 \\ Y_R/2 & -Y_R/2 \end{bmatrix}$$

Since row and column 2 of the $Y_{FULL}$matrix is to be eliminated, we can rewrite $Y_{FULL}$ without row 2 and column 2. We will call this rewritten matrix $Y'_{FULL}$.

$$Y'_{FULL} =
\begin{bmatrix} 0 & Y_R \\ Y_R & 0 \end{bmatrix}$$

Now we have a basis to create the translation equation by finding an equation that translates each entry in $Y'_{FULL}$ to the corresponding entry in $Y_{PORTS}$:

$$\begin{bmatrix} 0 \Rightarrow -Y_R/2 & Y_R \Rightarrow Y_R/2 \\ Y_R \Rightarrow Y_R/2 & 0 \Rightarrow -Y_R/2 \end{bmatrix}$$

For each of the four entries, it can be observed that subtracting $Y_R/2$ from the left-of-arrow value successfully makes the translation. Since $Y_R/2$ is identical to ${Y_R}^2 /(2Y_R)$, each case of $Y'_{FULL}$ meets the condition $Y'_{ij} = Y_{ij} - Y_{ij}Y_{ji} /Y_{kk}$ shown in the general translation equations.

The same process may be used for elements of arbitrary admittance ($Y_{11} \neq -Y_{12} , Y_{ij} \neq Y_{ji}$ etc.) and networks of arbitrary size, but the algebra becomes more complex. The trick is to deduce and/or calculate an expression that translates the original matrix entries to the reduced matrix entries.

== See also ==
- Star-mesh transform
- Schur complement
- Power-flow study
