= Redispatch =

Redispatch may refer to:

- System redispatch, a procedure in electric grid operations.
- Reclearance, a procedure in flight planning.
