= Y-matrix =

Y-matrix may refer to:

- The matrix of admittance parameters, describing an electrical network viewed as a black-box with ports
- The nodal admittance matrix, arising in the nodal analysis of an electrical network
