= Diakoptics =

Solution of problems by subdivision

In systems analysis, Diakoptics (Greek dia–through + kopto–cut, tear) or the "Method of Tearing" involves breaking a (usually physical) problem down into subproblems which can be solved independently before being joined back together to obtain an exact solution to the whole problem. The term was introduced by Gabriel Kron in a series "Diakoptics — The Piecewise Solution of Large-Scale Systems" published in London, England by The Electrical Journal between June 7, 1957 and February 1959. The twenty-one installments were collected and published as a book of the same title in 1963. The term diakoptics was coined by Philip Stanley of the Union College Department of Philosophy.

== Features ==
According to Kron, "Diakoptics, or the Method of Tearing, is a combined theory of a pair of storehouses of information, namely equations+graph, or matrices+graph, associated with a given physical or economic system." What Kron was saying here is that in order to carry out the Method of Tearing, not only were the system equations needed, but also the topology of the system.

Diakoptics was explained in terms of algebraic topology by J. Paul Roth. Roth describes how Kirchhoff's circuit laws in an electrical network with a given impedance matrix or admittance matrix can be solved for currents and voltages by using the circuit topology. Roth translates Kron’s "orthogonality conditions" into exact sequences of homology or cohomology. Roth’s interpretation is confirmed by Raoul Bott in reports in Mathematical Reviews. Roth says, "tearing consists essentially in deducing from the solution of one (easier to solve) network K^{~} the solution of a network K having the same number of branches as K^{~} and having the same isomorphism L between the groups of 1-chains and 1-cochains."

Diakoptics can be seen applied for instance in the text Solution of Large Networks by Matrix Methods.

Diakoptics is peculiar as a decomposition method, in that it involves taking values on the "intersection layer" (the boundary between subsystems) into account. The method has been rediscovered by the parallel processing community under the name "Domain Decomposition".

According to Keith Bowden, "Kron was undoubtedly searching for an ontology of engineering". Bowden also described "a multilevel hierarchical version of the method, in which the subsystems are recursively torn into subsubsystems".

When parallel computing was provided by the transputer, Keith Bowden described how diakoptics might be applied. It is an ongoing open question how the parallelism of quantum computing may be relevant.

== Japan ==
In 1951, "a group of about twenty scientists and engineers was organized in Japan for the unifying study of basic problems in engineering sciences by means of geometry….reorganized in 1954 into a new organization called the Research Association of Applied Geometry (RAAG)."

"Kron was...the first charter member from overseas. He remained an Honorary Member until he passed away. Meanwhile, the RAAG membership roll has been increased to two hundred and fifty, distributed throughout the world." Many articles on diakoptics, by Kron and others, were published in the Memoirs of RAAG.

The journal Tensor (ISSN 0040-3504), published in Sapporo, Japan, placed Kron on its "honorary editorial board" in 1951. He contributed an article to the March 1955 issue.

== United Kingdom ==
"Kron’s influence extends far beyond the U.S.A. The Tensor Society of Great Britain came into being to further the understanding and applications of tensor analysis." In 1950 it was founded by S. Austen Stigant as The Tensor Club of Great Britain, and began publishing Matrix and Tensor Quarterly (ISSN 0025-5998). According to Kron, it was S. Austen Stigant that first suggested Kron write his serial "Diakoptics" for the Electrical Journal. In September 1961 the Club became a Society. In 1968 (volume 19) the Quarterly published a commemorative issue to note the death of Gabriel Kron. The Quarterly continued publishing until 1987.

"C.H. Flurscheim and J.R. Mortlock of Associated Electrical Industries Ltd. [encouraged] the Power Systems Engineering Department of that company to investigate the applications of Diakoptics to the solution of practical load-flow problems and some difficult mechanical vibration problems; investigations which yielded results of considerable value."

== See also ==
- Component-based software engineering
- Subroutine
