= Electrical Transient Analyzer Program =

Power system software modeling tool

ETAP - Operation Technology, Inc.
- ETAP
- Type: Private
- Industry: Computer software
- Founded: 1986
- Headquarters: Irvine, California
- Area served: Worldwide
- Key people: Tanuj Khandelwal (CEO); Tuan Lam (CTO, Digital Twin); Farrokh Shokooh (Chairman & CEO, 1986–2021)
- Website: etap.com

Electrical Transient Analyzer Program (ETAP) is a simulation program used for the design, modeling and simulation, analysis, and operation of electrical power systems. It is developed and licensed by ETAP, which is part of Schneider Electric. The core function of ETAP is to create a simulation of electrical networks for the purposes of modeling, simulating, and optimizing a system's performance, power system dynamics, transient scenarios and protection, reliability and safety.

ETAP possesses analysis modules that encompass load flow and voltage drop, short circuit analysis, protective device coordination, transient stability, harmonics analysis, arc flash hazard calculation, and power flow.

Schneider Electric took controlling stake in ETAP on November 16, 2020. The current CEO of ETAP is Tanuj Khandelwal.

ETAP was originally developed for the MS-DOS operating system for the purposes of commercial and nuclear power system analysis and system operations.

== Ownership and Corporate Structure ==
ETAP (Operation Technology, Inc.) was founded in 1986 by Farrokh Shokooh and operated as a private, independent software company based in Irvine, California, for decades. This independent status allowed ETAP to develop its flagship software as a vendor-agnostic platform, meaning its modeling and analysis tools are designed to work with equipment from virtually any manufacturer. The company grew to become a global leader in power system design, modeling, and simulation, servicing utilities, industrial facilities, and major engineering firms worldwide before a significant change in its corporate ownership structure.

The company’s ownership fundamentally shifted in 2021 when Schneider Electric completed the acquisition of a controlling stake in ETAP. The initial agreement for Schneider Electric to acquire 80% of the company was signed in November 2020, with the transaction completing in June 2021. Despite being consolidated within Schneider Electric's Energy Management business, ETAP continues to operate as an independent software vendor. This arrangement is designed to allow ETAP to maintain its vendor-agnostic status, while its technology is integrated into Schneider Electric's broader digital offerings, enhancing their combined capabilities in electrical design and digital twin solutions for mission-critical power systems.
