= Gabriel Kron =

Hungarian American electrical engineer (1901-1968)

- Born: December 1, 1901; Nagybánya, Austria-Hungary
- Died: October 25, 1968 (aged 66–67); Schenectady, New York, USA
- Education: University of Michigan
- Known for: Kron reduction Diakoptics
- Awards: Montefiore Prize; Coffin Award
- Scientific career
- Fields: Electrical engineering
- Workplaces: General Electric

Gabriel Kron (1901–1968) was a Hungarian American electrical engineer who promoted the use of methods of linear algebra, multilinear algebra, and differential geometry in the field. His method of system decomposition and solution called Diakoptics is still influential today. Though he published widely, his methods were slow to be assimilated. At Union College a symposium was organized by Schaffer Library on "Gabriel Kron, the Man and His Work", held October 14, 1969. H.H. Happ edited the contributed papers, which were published by Union College Press as Gabriel Kron and Systems Theory.

== Early life ==
Gabriel Kron was born in 1901 in Baia Mare in Transylvania, Hungary. In 1919 he graduated from the gymnasium. By that time Transylvania had been ceded to Romania. Kron's older brother Joseph returned home, which he had left when he was ten years old. Joseph wished for a professional degree, but had no schooling after grade five. Gabriel tutored Joseph, who passed various exams, culminating in the high-school exam in 1920. In December of that year the two left home for the United States. The brothers earned their living in New York City with odd jobs such as dish washer, bus boy, or working machines in garment factories.

In the fall of 1922 the brothers had saved enough money to enter engineering school at University of Michigan. They continued supporting themselves with casual employment. Gabriel found digging ditches more congenial than dishwashing. He coined the motto: "There are only two occupations compatible with human dignity. One is the study of atomic structure. The other is digging ditches."

In 1925 Gabriel graduated and started on a trip around the world. He planned to walk and hitch hike as much as possible. He ran out of money when he reached Los Angeles, where he worked for the United States Electrical Manufacturing Company. He then transferred to the Robbins and Myers Company in Springfield, Ohio. In 1926 he set out again. From California he took passage on an oil tanker bound for Tahiti. In Sydney, Australia he ran out of money. After saving 35 pounds from work at the Electricity Metering Manufacturing Company he set out for Northern Australia.

In Fiji he had finished, and buried, Treatise on Differential Equations by Forsyth. In Sydney he searched for a worthy successor, settling on Advanced Vector Analysis with Application to Mathematical Physics by the Australian C.E. Weatherburn. During long hikes in Queensland, Kron saw that vector analysis would be a powerful tool in engineering. Sea voyages took him to Saigon via Borneo, Manila, and Hong Kong. Hence overland to Cairo and Alexandria by rail, supplemented by many hours of walking. In the spring of 1928 Kron arrived in Romania and stayed with his family till the fall.

After his return Kron was employed as electrical engineer for brief periods with several companies the last of which was Warner Brothers in New York. They closed his department while he was on a continuing highly paid contract. He economized by living with his family in Romania. There he studied the mathematical tools of the general theory of relativity and conceived his method for applying tensor analysis to electrical power engineering. This was described in a paper entitled "Non-Riemannian Dynamics of Rotating Electrical Machinery" printed in Romania and distributed to friends. In 1933 Kron returned to the US where his paper had been well received. He worked at General Electric from 1934 until he retired in 1966.

Kron was awarded the Montefiore Prize of the University of Liège, Belgium, for the paper written in Romania.

== Career ==
Kron's career developed within the General Electric corporation and has been described by P.L. Alger Alger explains that Kron made a positive impression at an AIEE conference held in New York in January 1934. The behavior of an electrical network was described as a dynamical system confined to a Non-Riemannian space. General Electric vice president Roy C. Muir "invited Gabe to join the staff of the Advanced Engineering Program under A.R. Stevenson". Furthermore, Philip Franklin of Massachusetts Institute of Technology approved Kron's paper for publication in MIT Journal of Mathematics and Physics, May 1934. "The paper instantly provoked widespread discussion and controversy. Many mathematicians derided his work: it was just for show, it was needlessly complex, or it was of no practical use."

According to Alger, Kron "worked with fifteen different managers while with General Electric". Alger explained, "Kron’s value was largely in the inspiration he gave to others and in distant objectives that seemed to business managers to be merely dreams." From 1936 to 1942 Kron published primarily in the General Electric Review. In 1942 John Wiley & Sons published his A Short Course in Tensor Analysis for Electrical Engineers. As recalled by Keith Bowden, "In the fifties, when Kron’s ideas were first introduced, controversy raged over their validity." Banesh Hoffmann was one academic that supported Kron's initiative. Hoffman wrote the Introduction to the second edition of Kron's book, now titled Tensors for Circuits (1959), distributed by Dover Publications.

In 1945 Kron suggested an approach to the Schrödinger equation with networks. The same year he used equivalent circuits to solve differential equations.

Kron proved to be a versatile employee: He worked in the Large Steam Turbine Engineering Department (1942), contributed to the control of atomic reactor piles (1945), and collaborated with Simon Ramo, Selden Crary, and Leon K. Kirchmayer on power systems. Alger notes that Kron "was a pioneer, not an educator. He used to imply that hard work is necessary for the mastery of any subject, and it does no good to make the way to understanding too easy." In 1951 Kron published Equivalent Circuits of Electrical Machinery. While continuing with laboratory and turbine assignments on weekdays, Kron began to prepare Diakoptics on his own. His vision realized with publication, in 1963 Kron was assigned to Analytical Engineering Division with H.H. Happ. Together they reviewed Kron's theory, and after Kron's death Happ published Diakoptics and Networks (1971).

A bibliography of Kron's writings is given as an appendix to Gabriel Kron and Systems Theory, pages 165 to 172. An earlier bibliography was compiled in 1959 and appeared in pages xiii to xviii of his book Tensors for Circuits.

== Awards and honors ==
Kron received the following awards and honors:

- Doctor of Science honoris causa, University of Nottingham, 1961
- Montefiore Prize, University of the Liège, Belgium, 1935
- Coffin Award, General Electric Company, 1942
- Master of Science in electrical engineering, Honorary, University of Michigan, 1936
- Patron and Honorary Member of the Tensor Club of Great Britain
- Honorary Member, Research Association of Applied Geometry, Tokyo

== Books by Kron ==
- Application of tensors to the analysis of rotating electrical machinery. 1938.
- Tensor analysis of networks. 1939. 2nd edn. 1965.
- A short course in tensor analysis for electrical engineers. 1942.
- Application of tensors to the analysis of rotating electrical machinery. 1942.
- Equivalent circuits of electric machinery. 1951. Dover reprint 1967.
- Tensors for circuits. 1959. (Dover 2nd edition of the book formerly entitled A short course in tensor analysis for electrical engineers)
- Diakoptics; the piecewise solution of large-scale systems. 1963.
