= Merit order =

Ranking of available sources of energy

The merit order is a way of ranking available sources of energy, especially electrical generation, based on ascending order of price (which may reflect the order of their short-run marginal costs of production) and sometimes pollution, together with amount of energy that will be generated. In a centralized management scheme, the ranking is such that those with the lowest marginal costs are the first sources to be brought online to meet demand, and the plants with the highest marginal costs are the last to be brought on line. Dispatching power generation in this way, known as economic dispatch, minimizes the cost of production of electricity. Sometimes generating units must be started out of merit order, due to transmission congestion, system reliability or other reasons.

In environmental dispatch, additional considerations concerning reduction of pollution further complicate the power dispatch problem. The basic constraints of the economic dispatch problem remain in place but the model is optimized to minimize pollutant emission in addition to minimizing fuel costs and total power loss.

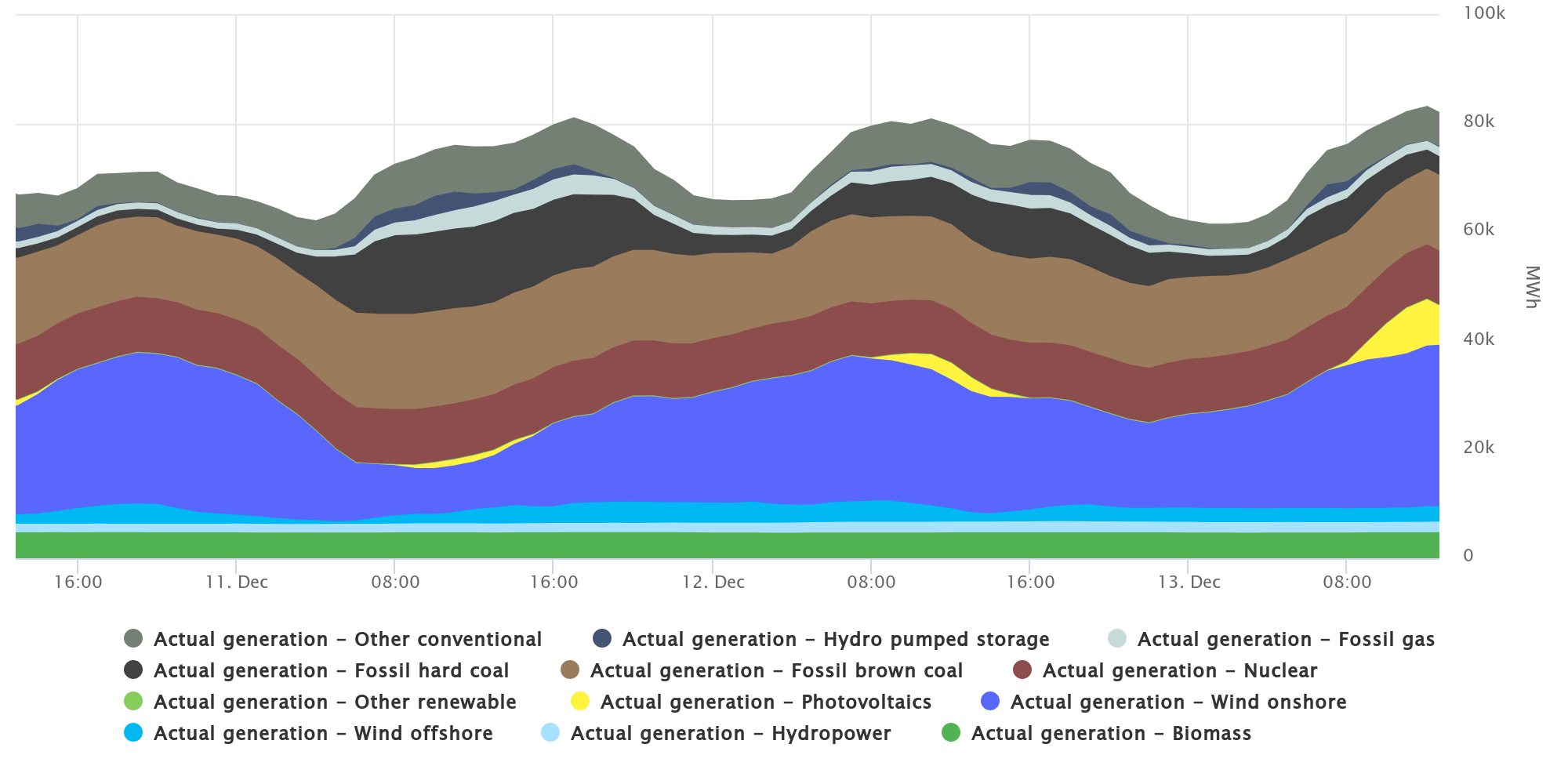
Plot from the SMARD data portal showing electricity generation in Germany in mid-December 2017. The ordering of the 'layers' is based on merit.

== The effect of renewable energy on merit order ==
The high demand for electricity during peak demand pushes up the bidding price for electricity, and the often relatively inexpensive baseload power supply mix is supplemented by 'peaking power plants', which produce electrical power at higher cost, and therefore are priced higher for their electrical output.

Increasing the supply of renewable energy tends to lower the average price per unit of electricity because wind energy and solar energy have very low marginal costs: they do not have to pay for fuel, and the sole contributors to their marginal cost is operations and maintenance. With cost often reduced by feed-in-tariff revenue, their electricity is, less costly on the spot market than that from coal or natural gas, and transmission companies typically buy from them first. Solar and wind electricity therefore substantially reduce the amount of highly priced peak electricity that transmission companies need to buy, during the times when solar/wind power is available, reducing the overall cost. A study by the Fraunhofer Institute ISI found that this "merit order effect" had allowed solar power to reduce the price of electricity on the German energy exchange by 10% on average, and by as much as 40% in the early afternoon. In 2007; as more solar electricity was fed into the grid, peak prices may come down even further. By 2006, the "merit order effect" indicated that the savings in electricity costs to German consumers, on average, more than offset the support payments paid by customers for renewable electricity generation.

A 2013 study estimated the merit order effect of both wind and photovoltaic electricity generation in Germany between the years 2008 and 2012. For each additional GWh of renewables fed into the grid, the price of electricity in the day-ahead market was reduced by 0.11–0.13 ¢/kWh. The total merit order effect of wind and photovoltaics ranged from 0.5 ¢/kWh in 2010 to more than 1.1 ¢/kWh in 2012.

The near-zero marginal cost of wind and solar energy does not, however, translate into zero marginal cost of peak load electricity in a competitive open electricity market system as wind and solar supply alone often cannot be dispatched to meet peak demand without incurring marginal transmission costs and potentially the costs of batteries. The purpose of the merit order dispatching paradigm was to enable the lowest net cost electricity to be dispatched first, thus minimising overall electricity system costs to consumers. Intermittent wind and solar is sometimes able to supply this economic function. If peak wind (or solar) supply and peak demand both coincide in time and quantity, the price reduction is larger. On the other hand, solar energy tends to be most abundant at noon, whereas peak demand is late afternoon in warm climates, leading to the so-called duck curve.

A 2008 study by the Fraunhofer Institute ISI in Karlsruhe, Germany found that wind power saves German consumers €5 billion a year. It is estimated to have lowered prices in European countries with high wind generation between 3 and 23 €/MWh. On the other hand, renewable energy in Germany increased the price for electricity, consumers there now pay 52.8 €/MWh more only for renewable energy (see German Renewable Energy Sources Act), average price for electricity in Germany now is increased to 26 ¢/kWh. Increasing electrical grid costs for new transmission, market trading and storage associated with wind and solar are not included in the marginal cost of power sources, instead grid costs are combined with source costs at the consumer end.

== Economic dispatch ==
Economic dispatch is the short-term determination of the optimal output of a number of electricity generation facilities, to meet the system load, at the lowest possible cost, subject to transmission and operational constraints. The Economic Dispatch Problem can be solved by specialized computer software which should satisfy the operational and system constraints of the available resources and corresponding transmission capabilities. In the US Energy Policy Act of 2005, the term is defined as "the operation of generation facilities to produce energy at the lowest cost to reliably serve consumers, recognising any operational limits of generation and transmission facilities".

The main idea is that, in order to satisfy the load at a minimum total cost, the set of generators with the lowest marginal costs must be used first, with the marginal cost of the final generator needed to meet load setting the system marginal cost. This is the cost of delivering one additional MWh of energy onto the system. Due to transmission constraints, this cost can vary at different locations within the power grid - these different cost levels are identified as "locational marginal prices" (LMPs). The historic methodology for economic dispatch was developed to manage fossil fuel burning power plants, relying on calculations involving the input/output characteristics of power stations.

=== Basic mathematical formulation ===
The following is based on an analytical methodology following Biggar and Hesamzadeh (2014) and Kirschen (2010). The economic dispatch problem can be thought of as maximising the economic welfare W of a power network whilst meeting system constraints.

For a network with n buses (nodes), suppose that S_{k} is the rate of generation, and D_{k} is the rate of consumption at bus k. Suppose, further, that C_{k}(S_{k}) is the cost function of producing power (i.e., the rate at which the generator incurs costs when producing at rate S_{k}), and V_{k}(D_{k}) is the rate at which the load receives value or benefits (expressed in currency units) when consuming at rate D_{k}. The total welfare is then

$$W= \sum_{k=1}^n V_k(D_k)- \sum_{k=1}^n C_k(S_k)$$

The economic dispatch task is to find the combination of rates of production and consumption (S_{k}, D_{k}) which maximise this expression W subject to a number of constraints:

$$\max_{S_k,D_k} W$$

The first constraint, which is necessary to interpret the constraints that follow, is that the net injection at each bus is equal to the total production at that bus less the total consumption:

$$\forall k, \; I_k=S_k-D_k$$

The power balance constraint requires that the sum of the net injections at all buses must be equal to the power losses in the branches of the network:

$$\sum_{k=1}^n I_k = L(I_1,I_2,\dots,I_{n-1})$$

The power losses L depend on the flows in the branches and thus on the net injections as shown in the above equation. However it cannot depend on the injections on all the buses as this would give an over-determined system. Thus one bus is chosen as the Slack bus and is omitted from the variables of the function L. The choice of Slack bus is entirely arbitrary, here bus n is chosen.

The second constraint involves capacity constraints on the flow on network lines. For a system with m lines this constraint is modeled as:

$$F_l(I_1,I_2,\dots,I_{n-1}) \leq F_{l}^{max} \qquad l=1,\dots,m$$

where F_{l} is the flow on branch l, and F_{l}^{max} is the maximum value that this flow is allowed to take. Note that the net injection at the slack bus is not included in this equation for the same reasons as above.

These equations can now be combined to build the Lagrangian of the optimization problem:

$$\mathcal{L}= \sum_{k=1}^n C_k(I_k) + \pi \left [ L(I_1,I_2,\dots,I_{n-1})-\sum_{k=1}^n I_k \right ] + \sum_{l=1}^m \mu_l \left [ F_{l}^{max}-F_l(I_1,I_2,\dots,I_{n-1}) \right ]$$

where π and μ are the Lagrangian multipliers of the constraints. The conditions for optimality are then:

$${\partial \mathcal{L}\over\partial I_k} = 0 \qquad k=1,\dots,n$$

$${\partial \mathcal{L}\over\partial \pi} = 0$$

$${\partial \mathcal{L}\over\partial \mu_l} = 0 \qquad l=1,\dots,m$$

$$\mu_l \cdot \left [ F_{l}^{max}-F_l(I_1,I_2,\dots,I_{n-1}) \right ]  = 0 \quad \mu_l \geq 0 \quad k=1,\dots,n$$

where the last condition is needed to handle the inequality constraint on line capacity.

Solving these equations is computationally difficult as they are nonlinear and implicitly involve the solution of the power flow equations. The analysis can be simplified using a linearised model called a DC power flow.

There is a special case which is found in much of the literature. This is the case in which demand is assumed to be perfectly inelastic (i.e., unresponsive to price). This is equivalent to assuming that $V_k(D_k)= M \min(D_k,\bar{D}_k)$ for some very large value of $M$ and inelastic demand $\bar{D}_k$. Under this assumption, the total economic welfare is maximised by choosing $D_k=\bar{D}_k$. The economic dispatch task reduces to:

$$\min_{S_k} \sum_{k=1}^n C_k(S_k)$$

Subject to the constraint that $\forall k, \; I_k=S_k-\bar{D}_k$ and the other constraints set out above.

=== Environmental dispatch ===
In environmental dispatch, additional considerations concerning reduction of pollution further complicate the power dispatch problem. The basic constraints of the economic dispatch problem remain in place but the model is optimized to minimize pollutant emission in addition to minimizing fuel costs and total power loss. Due to the added complexity, a number of algorithms have been employed to optimize this environmental/economic dispatch problem. Notably, a modified bees algorithm implementing chaotic modeling principles was successfully applied not only in silico, but also on a physical model system of generators. Other methods used to address the economic emission dispatch problem include Particle Swarm Optimization (PSO) and neural networks

Another notable algorithm combination is used in a real-time emissions tool called Locational Emissions Estimation Methodology (LEEM) that links electric power consumption and the resulting pollutant emissions. The LEEM estimates changes in emissions associated with incremental changes in power demand derived from the locational marginal price (LMP) information from the independent system operators (ISOs) and emissions data from the US Environmental Protection Agency (EPA). LEEM was developed at Wayne State University as part of a project aimed at optimizing water transmission systems in Detroit, MI starting in 2010 and has since found a wider application as a load profile management tool that can help reduce generation costs and emissions.

== See also ==
- Electricity market
- Bid-based, security-constrained, economic dispatch with nodal prices
- Unit commitment problem in electrical power production
- German Renewable Energy Sources Act
