= Operating reserve =

Short-term reserve of electricity generating capacity

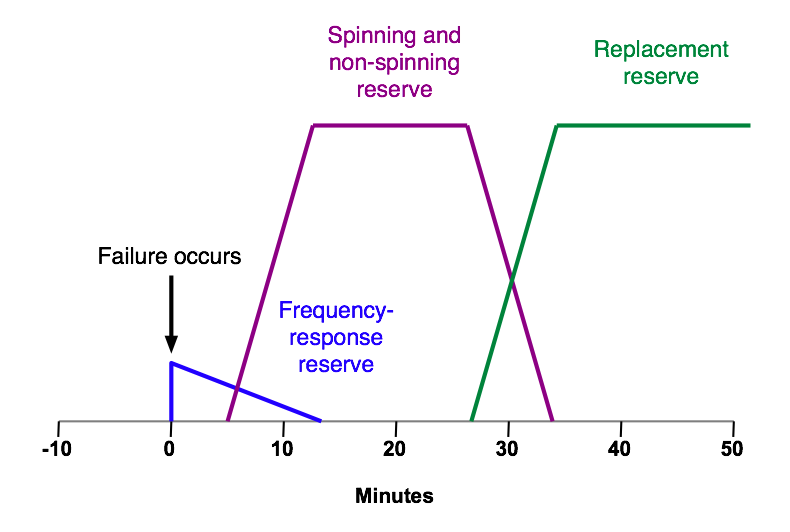
An idealized representation of the four kinds of reserve power and the time intervals after an unexpected failure that they are in use.

In electricity networks, the operating reserve is the generating capacity available to the system operator within a short interval of time to meet demand in case a generator goes down or there is another disruption to the supply. Most power systems are designed so that, under normal conditions, the operating reserve is always at least the capacity of the largest supplier plus a fraction of the peak load.

== Types of operating reserve ==
The operating reserve is made up of the spinning reserve as well as the non-spinning or supplemental reserve:

- The spinning reserve is the extra generating capacity that is available by increasing the power output of generators that are already connected to the power system. For most generators, this increase in power output is achieved by increasing the torque applied to the turbine's rotor.
- The non-spinning reserve or supplemental reserve is the extra generating capacity that is not currently connected to the system but can be brought online after a short delay. In isolated power systems, this typically equates to the power available from fast-start generators. However, in interconnected power systems, this may include the power available on short notice by importing power from other systems or retracting power that is currently being exported to other systems.

Generators that intend to provide either spinning and non-spinning reserve should be able to reach their promised capacity within roughly ten minutes. Most power system guidelines require a significant fraction of their operating reserve to come from spinning reserve. This is because the spinning reserve is slightly more reliable (it doesn't suffer from start-up issues) and can respond quickly, whereas with non-spinning reserve generators, there is a delay as the generator starts-up offline. Batteries are also used as operating reserve, as they can react within fractions of a second.

Centrally controlled air conditioners and thermostats that are used in large residential areas can be used as a fast and considerable curtailment reserve. Advantages of this technology are under study.

Operating reserve is a crucial concept for ensuring that the day-ahead planning of generators' schedule can withstand the uncertainty due to unforeseen variations in the load profile or equipment (generators, transformers, transmission links) faults.

In 2006, the California Independent System Operator had an operating reserve at 6% of the metered load. Included in that is a spinning reserve at 3% of the metered load.

== Other types of reserve ==
In addition, there are two other kinds of reserve power that are often discussed in combination with the operating reserve: the frequency-response reserve and the replacement reserve.

- The frequency-response reserve (also known as regulating reserve) is provided as an automatic reaction to a loss in supply. It occurs because immediately following a loss of supply, the generators slow down due to the increased load. To combat this slowing, many generators have a governor. By helping the generators to speed up, these governors provide a small boost to both the output frequency and the power of each generator. However, because the frequency-response reserve is often small and not at the discretion of the system operator it is not considered part of the operating reserve.
- The replacement reserve (also known as contingency reserve) is reserve power provided by generators that require a longer start-up time (typically thirty to sixty minutes). It is used to relieve the generators providing the spinning or non-spinning reserve and thus restore the operating reserve (confusingly the replacement reserve is sometimes known as the 30 or 60-minute operating reserve).
