= Unit commitment problem in electrical power production =

Mathematical optimization problems

The unit commitment problem (UC) in electrical power production is a large family of mathematical optimization problems where the production of a set of electrical generators is coordinated in order to achieve some common target, usually either matching the energy demand at minimum cost or maximizing revenue from electricity production. This is necessary because it is difficult to store electrical energy on a scale comparable with normal consumption; hence, each (substantial) variation in the consumption must be matched by a corresponding variation of the production.

Coordinating generation units is a difficult task for a number of reasons:

- the number of units can be large (hundreds or thousands);
- there are several types of units, with significantly different energy production costs and constraints about how power can be produced;
- generation is distributed across a vast geographical area (e.g., a country), and therefore the response of the electrical grid, itself a highly complex system, has to be taken into account: even if the production levels of all units are known, checking whether the load can be sustained and what the losses are requires highly complex power flow computations.

Because the relevant details of the electrical system vary greatly worldwide, there are many variants of the UC problem, which are often very difficult to solve. This is also because, since some units require quite a long time (many hours) to start up or shut down, the decisions need be taken well in advance (usually, the day before), which implies that these problems have to be solved within tight time limits (several minutes to a few hours). UC is therefore one of the fundamental problems in power system management and simulation. It has been studied for many years, and still is one of the most significant energy optimization problems. Recent surveys on the subject count many hundreds of scientific articles devoted to the problem. Furthermore, several commercial products comprise specific modules for solving UC, such as MAON and PLEXOS, or are even entirely devoted to its solution.

== Elements of unit commitment problems ==
There are many different UC problems, as the electrical system is structured and governed differently across the world. Common elements are:

- A time horizon along which the decisions have to be made, sampled at a finite number of time instants. This is usually one or two days, up to a week, where instants are usually hours or half-hours; less frequently, 15 or 5 minutes. Hence, time instants are typically between 24 and around 2000.
- A set of generating units with the corresponding energy production cost and/or emission curves, and (complex) technical constraints.
- A representation of the significant part of the grid network.
- A (forecasted) load profile to be satisfied, i.e., the net amount of energy to be delivered to each node of the grid network at each time instant.
- Possibly, a set of reliability constraints ensuring that demand will be satisfied even if some unforeseen events occur.
- Possibly, financial and/or regulatory conditions (energy revenues, market operation constraints, financial instruments, ...).

The decisions that have to be taken usually comprise:

- commitment decisions: whether a unit is producing energy at any time instant;
- production decisions: how much energy a unit is producing at any time instant;
- network decisions: how much energy is flowing (and in which direction) on each branch of the transmission and/or distribution grid at any given time instant.

While the above features are usually present, there are many combinations and many different cases. Among these we mention:

- whether the units and the grid are all handled by a Monopolistic Operator (MO), or a separate Transmission System Operator (TSO) manages the grid providing fair and not discriminatory access to generating companies (GenCos) that compete to satisfy the production on the (or, most often, several interconnected) energy market(s);
- the different kinds of energy production units, such as thermal/nuclear ones, hydro-electric ones, and renewable sources (wind, solar, ...);
- which units can be modulated, i.e., their produced energy can be decided by the operator (albeit subject to the technical constraints of the unit), as opposed to it being entirely dictated by external factors such as weather conditions;
- the level of detail at which the working of the electrical grid must be considered, ranging from basically ignoring it to considering the possibility of dynamically opening (interrupting) a line in order to optimally change the energy routing on the grid.

=== Management objectives ===
The objectives of UC depend on the aims of the actor for which it is solved. For a MO, this is basically to minimize energy production costs while satisfying the demand; reliability and emissions are usually treated as constraints. In a free-market regime, the aim is rather to maximize energy production profits, i.e., the difference between revenues (due to selling energy) and costs (due to producing it). If the GenCo is a price maker, i.e., it has sufficient size to influence market prices, it may in principle perform strategic bidding in order to improve its profits. This means bidding its production at high cost so as to raise market prices, losing market share but retaining some because, essentially, there is not enough generation capacity. For some regions this may be due to the fact that there is not enough grid network capacity to import energy from nearby regions with available generation capacity. While the electrical markets are highly regulated in order to, among other things, rule out such behavior, large producers can still benefit from simultaneously optimizing the bids of all their units to take into account their combined effect on market prices. On the contrary, price takers can simply optimize each generator independently, as, not having a significant impact on prices, the corresponding decisions are not correlated.

=== Types of production units ===
In the context of UC, generating units are usually classified as:

- Thermal units, which include nuclear ones, that burn some sort of fuel to produce electricity. They are subject to numerous complex technical constraints, among which we mention minimum up/down time, ramp up/down rate, modulation/stability (a unit cannot change its production level too many times), and start-up/shut-down ramp rate (when starting/stopping, a unit must follow a specific power curve which may depend on how long the plant has been offline/online). Therefore, optimizing even a single unit is in principle already a complex problem which requires specific techniques.
- Hydro units, that generate energy by harvesting water potential energy, are often organized into systems of connected reservoirs called hydro valleys. Because water released by an upstream reservoir reaches the downstream one (after some time), and therefore becomes available to generate energy there, decisions on the optimal production must be taken for all units simultaneously, which makes the problem rather difficult even if no (or little) thermal production is involved, even more so if the complete electrical system is considered. Hydro units may include pumped-storage units, where energy can be spent to pump water uphill. This is the only current technology capable of storing enough (potential) energy to be significant at the typical level of the UC problem. Hydro units are subject to complex technical constraints. The amount of energy generated by turbining some amount of water is not constant, but it depends on the water head which in turn depends on previous decisions. The relationship is nonlinear and nonconvex, making the problem particularly difficult to solve.
- Renewable generation units, such as wind farms, solar plants, run-of-river hydro units (without a dedicated reservoir, and therefore whose production is dictated by the flowing water), and geothermal units. Most of these cannot be modulated, and several are also intermittent, i.e., their production is difficult to accurately forecast well in advance. In UC, these units do not really correspond to decisions, since they cannot be influenced. Rather, their production is considered fixed and added to that of the other sources. The substantial increase of intermittent renewable generation in recent years has significantly increased uncertainty in the net load (demand minus production that cannot be modulated), which has challenged the traditional view that the forecasted load in UC is accurate enough.

=== Electrical grid models ===
There are three different ways in which the energy grid is represented within a UC:

- In the single bus approximation the grid is ignored: demand is considered to be satisfied whenever total production equals total demand, irrespective of their geographical location.
- In the DC approximation only Kirchhoff's current law is modeled; this corresponds to reactive power flow being neglected, the voltage angles differences being considered small, and the angle voltage profile being assumed constant;
- In the full AC model the complete Kirchhoff laws are used: this results in highly nonlinear and nonconvex constraints in the model.

When the full AC model is used, UC actually incorporates the optimal power flow problem, which is already a nonconvex nonlinear problem.

Recently, the traditional "passive" view of the energy grid in UC has been challenged. In a fixed electrical network currents cannot be routed, their behavior being entirely dictated by nodal power injection: the only way to modify the network load is therefore to change nodal demand or production, for which there is limited scope. However, a somewhat counter-intuitive consequence of Kirchhoff laws is that interrupting a line (maybe even a congested one) causes a global re-routing of electrical energy and may therefore improve grid performances. This has led to defining the Optimal Transmission Switching problem, whereby some of the lines of the grid can be dynamically opened and closed across the time horizon. Incorporating this feature in the UC problem makes it difficult to solve even with the DC approximation, even more so with the full AC model.

== Uncertainty in unit commitment problems ==
A troubling consequence of the fact that UC needs be solved well in advance to the actual operations is that the future state of the system is not known exactly, and therefore needs be estimated. This used to be a relatively minor problem when the uncertainty in the system was only due to variation of users' demand, which on aggregate can be forecasted quite effectively, and occurrence of lines or generators faults, which can be dealt with by well established rules (spinning reserve). However, in recent years the production from intermittent renewable production sources has significantly increased. This has, in turn, very significantly increased the impact of uncertainty in the system, so that ignoring it (as traditionally done by taking average point estimates) risks significant cost increases. This had made it necessary to resort to appropriate mathematical modeling techniques to properly take uncertainty into account, such as:

- Robust optimization approaches;
- Scenario optimization approaches;
- Chance-constrained optimization approaches.

The combination of the (already, many) traditional forms of UC problems with the several (old and) new forms of uncertainty gives rise to the even larger family of Uncertain Unit Commitment (UUC) problems, which are currently at the frontier of applied and methodological research.

== Integrated Transmission and Distribution Models ==
One of the major issues with the real-time unit commitment problem is the fact that the electricity demand of the transmission network is usually treated as a "load point" at each distribution system. The reality, however, is that each load point is a complex distribution network with its own sub-loads, generators, and DERs. By simplifying a distribution into load points can lead to extreme operational troubles of the whole power grid. Such problems include high pressure on the power transmission system and reverse power flow from the distribution systems towards the power transmission system. A newly pursued approach for more effectively solving the unit-commitment problem hence is born by Integrated Transmission and Distribution Systems. In such models, the unit commitment problem of the Transmission Systems is usually combined with the Renewable Management Problem of the Distribution Systems by the means of bi-level programming tools.

== See also ==
- Electricity market
