= Nodal admittance matrix =

N x N matrix describing a linear power system with N buses

In power engineering, nodal admittance matrix (or just admittance matrix) is an N x N matrix describing a linear power system with N buses. It represents the nodal admittance of the buses in a power system. In realistic systems which contain thousands of buses, the admittance matrix is quite sparse. Each bus in a real power system is usually connected to only a few other buses through the transmission lines. The nodal admittance matrix is used in the formulation of the power flow problem.

== Construction from a single line diagram ==
The nodal admittance matrix of a power system is a form of Laplacian matrix of the nodal admittance diagram of the power system, which is derived by the application of Kirchhoff's laws to the admittance diagram of the power system. Starting from the single line diagram of a power system, the nodal admittance diagram is derived by:

- replacing each line in the diagram with its equivalent admittance, and
- converting all voltage sources to their equivalent current source.

Consider an admittance graph with $N$ buses. The vector of bus voltages, $V$, is an $N \times 1$ vector where $V_{k}$ is the voltage of bus $k$, and vector of bus current injections, $I$, is an $N \times 1$ vector where $I_{k}$ is the cumulative current injected at bus $k$ by all loads and sources connected to the bus. The admittance between buses $k$ and $i$ is a complex number $y_{ki}$, and is the sum of the admittance of all lines connecting buses $k$ and $i$. The admittance between the bus $k$ and ground is $y_{k}$, and is the sum of the admittance of all the loads connected to bus $k$.

Consider the current injection, $I_{k}$, into bus $k$. Applying Kirchhoff's current law

$$I_{k} = \sum_{i=1, 2, \ldots, N} I_{ki}$$

where $I_{ki}$ is the current from bus $k$ to bus $i$ for $k \neq i$ and $I_{kk}$ is the current from bus $k$ to ground through the bus load. Applying Ohm's law to the admittance diagram, the bus voltages and the line and load currents are linked by the relation

$$I_{ki} = \begin{cases}
V_{k} {y_{k}}, & \mbox{if} \quad i = k \\
( V_{k} - V_{i} ) y_{ki},  & \mbox{if} \quad i \neq k.
\end{cases}$$

Therefore,

$$I_{k}
= \sum_{i=1, 2, \ldots, N \atop i \neq k} { ( V_{k} - V_{i} ) y_{ki} } + V_{k} y_{k}
= V_{k} \left( y_{k} + \sum_{i=1, 2, \ldots, N \atop i \neq k} y_{ki} \right) - \sum_{i=1, 2, \ldots, N \atop i \neq k} V_{i} y_{ki}$$

This relation can be written succinctly in matrix form using the admittance matrix. The nodal admittance matrix $Y$ is a $N \times N$ matrix such that bus voltage and current injection satisfy Ohm's law

$$Y V = I$$

in vector format. The entries of $Y$ are then determined by the equations for the current injections into buses, resulting in

$$Y_{kj} = \begin{cases}
y_{k} + \sum_{i=1, 2, \ldots, N \atop i \neq k} {y_{ki}}, & \mbox{if} \quad k = j \\
-y_{kj},  & \mbox{if} \quad k \neq j.
\end{cases}$$

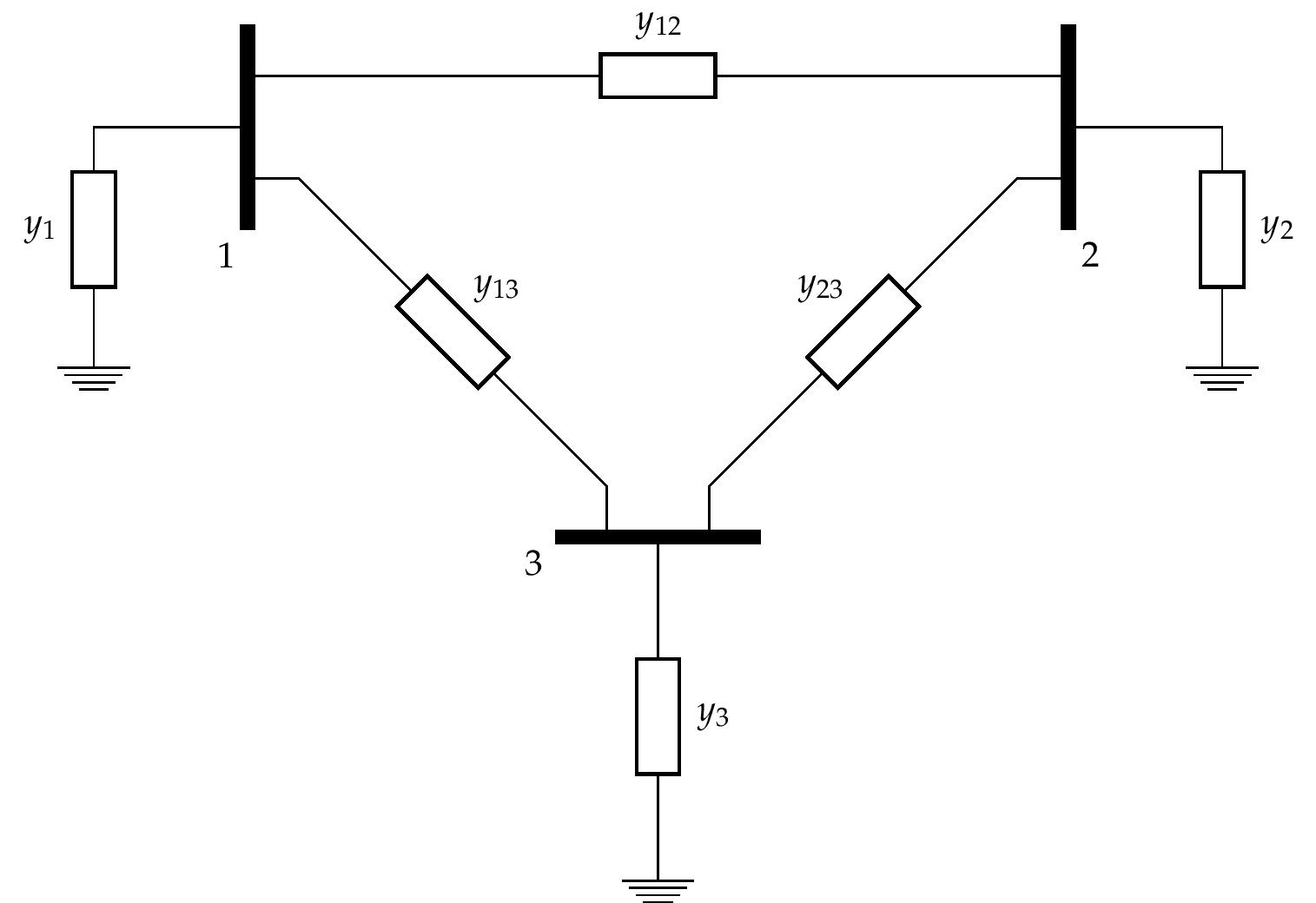
Figure 1: The admittance diagram of a three bus network.

As an example, consider the admittance diagram of a fully connected three bus network of figure 1. The admittance matrix derived from the three bus network in the figure is:

$$Y = \begin{pmatrix}
y_{1} + y_{12} + y_{13} & -y_{12} & -y_{13} \\
-y_{12} & y_{2} + y_{12} + y_{23} & -y_{23} \\
-y_{13} & -y_{23} & y_{3} + y_{13} + y_{23} \\
\end{pmatrix}$$

The diagonal entries $Y_{11}, Y_{22}, ..., Y_{nn}$ are called the self-admittances of the network nodes. The non-diagonal entries are the mutual admittances of the nodes corresponding to the subscripts of the entry. The admittance matrix $Y$ is typically a symmetric matrix as $Y_{ki} = Y_{ik}$. However, extensions of the line model may make $Y$ asymmetrical. For instance, modeling phase-shifting transformers, results in a Hermitian admittance matrix.

== Applications ==
The admittance matrix is most often used in the formulation of the power flow problem.

== See also ==
- Admittance parameters
- Nodal analysis
- Zbus
