= Perry Rotella =

American businessman

Perry F. Rotella
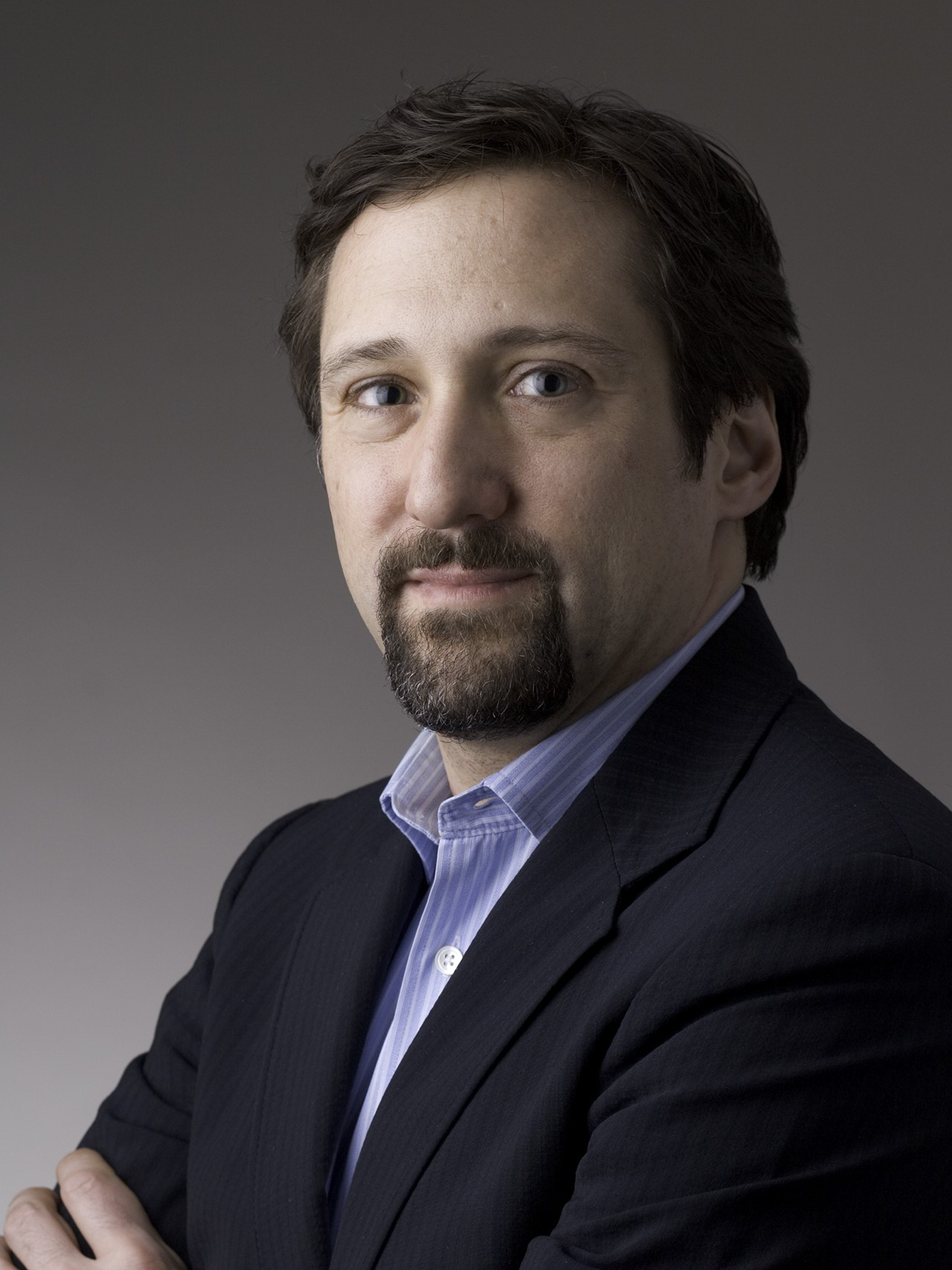
- Perry Rotella in 2007
- Born: May 28, 1963 (age 63); Danbury, Connecticut
- Education: University of Pennsylvania
- Occupation: Executive
- Employer: Box
- Known for: SVP, Supply Chain Risk Executive, CIO, Verisk, President of New York Metro chapter of SIM
- Website: Verisk Profile with Picture, perryrotella.com

Perry Francis Rotella (born May 28, 1963) is an American businessman. He is currently a managing director at Box. He previously served as the senior vice president, supply chain group executive and chief information officer of Verisk Analytics, a Jersey City, New Jersey–based corporation. Rotella has held multiple information technology executive positions with different large American companies. He also serves as the elected president of the New York Metro chapter of the Society for Information Management, as a member of the governing body of InfoWorld's Tri-State CIO Forum, and as a mentor in Columbia University's Executive Master of Science in Technology Management program. According to a Verisk press release, he was responsible for overseeing the development and implementation of information technology initiatives such as systems for managing risk and fraud for mortgage, healthcare, insurance, and human resources companies as well as governments.

== Education and early life ==
Rotella was born on May 28, 1963, in Danbury, Connecticut, to Irene Rotella, a banker, and Louis Rotella, a US Navy World War II veteran and carpenter. He lived there through high school and graduated from Danbury High School in 1981, where he was class treasurer. In college, Rotella became interested in computer science and business and pursued degrees accordingly. He graduated from the University of Pennsylvania in 1985 with bachelor's degrees in mathematics and economics. Rotella was a member of the fraternity Alpha Chi Rho and served as chapter president during his junior year. During his years at Penn, computers were becoming increasingly popular and user-friendly for both business and home use and represented a promising career.

== Career at AMS and AIG (1985–2006) ==
Rotella started his career in 1985 at the now-defunct computer consulting company American Management Systems (AMS), where he held various positions including chief technology officer for AMS's Insurance Technology Group. Rotella worked at AMS for 14 years, from his graduation in 1985 until he joined AIG.

Rotella joined American International Group in 1999 as a vice president. In 2000, he became AIG's global chief technology officer, a position he held until 2003. He then became the chief information officer of AIG's Domestic Brokerage Group, serving until 2006 when he became an Operation and Systems Executive. He held that position until December 2006, when he joined Moody's Corporation.

== Career at Moody's and Verisk (2006–2016) ==
In December 2006, Rotella joined Moody's Corporation as the senior vice president and chief information officer, a position he held for nearly three years until October 2009. Before joining Moody's, Rotella's primary role had always been a focus on information technology. At Moody's, Rotella's career took a turn toward a principal focus on supporting overall business strategy with his background in IT. The change was demonstrated in a January 2007 press release, where Rotella was quoted after being named CIO of Moody's with the following:

Having been a CIO in another organization, this is exciting for me because I have a seat at the management table...It's exciting to be able to deliver on technology while being a core contributor to business strategy.

Rotella joined Verisk Analytics in October 2009, the same week as their headline-making initial public offering on October 6, 2009, which was the biggest IPO of any American company since Visa's in March 2008. Rotella has continued his shift from an IT executive to a business strategy executive who focuses on IT at Verisk. According to Verisk, he is "responsible for the development and execution of information technology initiatives at Verisk Analytics in support of the company's business operations." Verisk CEO Frank J. Coyne acknowledged Rotella upon announcing the appointment of a new CIO, saying, "With IT management experience spanning more than 23 years in diverse industries, Perry is an acknowledged thought leader in information technology...He brings a wealth of professional IT accomplishments to our organization."

In 2013, Rotella became responsible for Verisk's supply chain analysis business as its group executive. He oversaw 3E, Cargonet, and Maplecroft.

== Current career (since 2016) ==
Since 2020, Rotella has been a senior financial services industry specialist as Amazon Web Services where he works on strategic projects for financial clients. He previously served at Gartner as a senior executive partner from 2017 to 2019 and as the president of PRF Advisory, a consulting company he founded, from 2016 to 2020.

== Other positions ==
In 2012, Rotella began writing a blog for Forbes.com called "IT Transforming Business." In 2008, Rotella was elected for a term as president of the New York Metro chapter of the Society for Information Management. He also is a member of the governing body of InfoWorld's Tri-State CIO Forum for the New York tri-state area. He also spends time at Columbia University as a mentor in their Executive Master of Science in Technology Management program.

== Personal life ==
Rotella lives in New York City. He holds a master angler award for a 35-inch record-length lake trout he caught while fishing in Stevens Lake in Manitoba, Canada, and is one of only two people to receive the master angler award for trout in 2004 at that lake. His wedding was featured in Flower Magazine in an article titled "Golden State of Matrimony". He has three sons: Michael L. Rotella, a financial services IT manager; Jake H. Rotella; and Evan A. Rotella. He also has a daughter, Madeline E. Rotella, a chemist.

== See also ==
- Verisk Analytics
- Wood Mackenzie
- Maplecroft
- Moody's Corporation
- AIG
- American Management Systems
- Society for Information Management
- Amazon Web Services
