= Cost of electricity by source =

Comparison of costs of different electricity generation sources

Different methods of electricity generation can incur a variety of different costs, which can be divided into three general categories: 1) wholesale costs, or all costs paid by utilities associated with acquiring and distributing electricity to consumers, 2) retail costs paid by consumers, and 3) external costs, or externalities, imposed on society.

Wholesale costs include initial capital, operations and maintenance (O&M), transmission, and costs of decommissioning. Depending on the local regulatory environment, some or all wholesale costs may be passed through to consumers. These are costs per unit of energy, typically represented as dollars/megawatt hour (wholesale). The calculations also assist governments in making decisions regarding energy policy.

== Cost metrics ==
Costs

Levelized cost: With increasingly widespread implementation of renewable energy sources, costs have declined, most notably for energy generated by solar panels.
Levelized cost of energy (LCOE) is a measure of the average net present cost of electricity generation for a generating plant over its lifetime.

Costs of renewable energy, especially solar photovoltaic (solar panels), have declined significantly, with 62% of total renewable power generation added in 2020 having lower costs than the cheapest new fossil fuel option.

"Learning curves": Trend of costs and deployment over time, with steeper lines showing greater cost reductions as deployment progresses. With increased deployment, renewables benefit from learning curves and economies of scale.

=== Levelized cost of electricity ===
The levelized cost of electricity (LCOE) is a metric that attempts to compare the costs of different methods of electricity generation irrespective of dispatchability. Though LCOE is often presented as the minimum constant price at which electricity must be sold to break even over the lifetime of the project, such a cost analysis requires assumptions about the value of various non-financial costs (environmental impacts, local availability, others), and is therefore controversial. Roughly calculated, LCOE is the net present value of all costs over the lifetime of the asset divided by an appropriately discounted total of the energy output from the asset over that lifetime. On average the levelized cost of electricity from utility scale solar power and onshore wind power is less than from coal and gas-fired power stations, but this varies greatly by location. Levelized full system costs of electricity include the cost of grid balancing.

=== Levelized avoided cost of electricity ===
The metric levelized avoided cost of energy (LACE) addresses some of the shortcomings of LCOE by considering the economic value that the source provides to the grid. The economic value takes into account the dispatchability of a resource, as well as the existing energy mix in a region.

In 2014, the US Energy Information Administration recommended that levelized costs of non-dispatchable sources such as wind or solar be compared to the "levelized avoided cost of energy" (LACE) rather than to the LCOE of dispatchable sources such as fossil fuels or geothermal. LACE is the total discounted avoided costs divided by the total discounted lifetime output. The EIA hypothesized that fluctuating power sources might not avoid capital and maintenance costs of backup dispatchable sources. The ratio of LACE to LCOE is referred to as the value-cost ratio. When LACE (value) is greater than LCOE (cost), then value-cost ratio is greater than 1, and the project is considered economically feasible.

=== Value-adjusted levelized cost of electricity ===
The value-adjusted levelized cost of electricity (VALCOE) is a metric devised by the International Energy Agency which includes both the cost of the electricity and the value to the electricity system. For example, the same amount of electricity is more valuable at a time of peak demand.

=== Capture rate ===
The capture rate is the volume-weighted average market price (or capture price) that a source receives divided by the time-weighted average price for electricity over a period. For example, a dammed hydro plant might only generate when prices are high and so have a capture rate of 200%, whereas a source that is not dispatchable, such as a wind farm without batteries, would typically have a capture rate under 100%.

Typically, the more of a single type of renewable that is built in a pricing area (such as Great Britain) the lower the capture rate will become for that type. For example, if many wind farms generate a lot at the same time the price at that time will go down. There can be curtailment if grid connectivity is lacking across the pricing area – for example from wind power in Scotland to consumers in England – resulting in the capture rate not reflecting the true cost.

=== Levelized cost of storage ===
The levelized cost of storage (LCOS) is analogous to LCOE, but applied to energy storage technologies such as batteries. Regardless of technology, storage is but a secondary source of electricity dependent on a primary source of generation. Thus, a true cost accounting demands that the costs of both primary and secondary sources be included when the cost of storage is compared to the cost of generating electricity in real time to meet demand.

A cost factor unique to storage are losses that occur due to inherent inefficiencies of storing electricity, as well as increased CO_{2} emissions if any component of the primary source is less than 100% carbon-free. In the US, a comprehensive 2015 study found that net system CO_{2} emissions resulting from storage operation are nontrivial when compared to the emissions from electricity generation [in real time to meet demand], ranging from 104 to 407 kg/MWh of delivered energy depending on location, storage operation mode, and assumptions regarding carbon intensity.

== Cost factors ==
While calculating costs, several internal cost factors have to be considered. Note the use of "costs," which is not the actual selling price, since this can be affected by a variety of factors such as subsidies and taxes:

- Capital costs tend to be low for gas and oil power stations; moderate for onshore wind turbines and solar PV (photovoltaics); higher for coal plants and higher still for waste-to-energy, wave and tidal, solar thermal, offshore wind and nuclear.
- Fuel costs – high for fossil fuel and biomass sources, low for nuclear, and zero for many renewables. Fuel costs can vary somewhat unpredictably over the life of the generating equipment, due to political and other factors.

To evaluate the total cost of production of electricity, the streams of costs are converted to a net present value using the time value of money. These costs are all brought together using discounted cash flow.

=== Capital costs ===
For power generation capacity capital costs are often expressed as overnight cost per kilowatt. Estimated costs in 2022 were:

Cost per kW
Type	US EIA	US NREL	$/MWh	CF
Coal power	$4,074	$3,075–5,542		
Coal with 90% carbon capture	$6,495–6,625			
Simple cycle natural gas		$922–2,630		
Combined-cycle	$1,062–1,201			
Combined-cycle with 90% carbon capture	$2,736–2,845			
Internal combustion engine	$2,018			
Turbine, aeroderivative	$1,294			
Turbine, industrial	$785			
Nuclear	$6,695–7,547	$7,442–7,989	$81–82	94%
Wind power	$1,718	$1,462	$27–75	18–48%
Wind, offshore	$4,833–6,041	$3,285–5,908	$67–146	29–52%
Distributed generation (wind)	$1,731–2,079	$2,275–5,803	$32–219	11–52%
Solar thermal/concentrated	$7,895	$6,505	$76–97	49–63%
Solar photovoltaic	$1,327	$1,333–2,743	$31–146	12–30%
Solar PV with storage	$1,748	$2,044	$53–81	20–31%
Battery storage	$1,316	$988–4,774		8–42%
Fuel cells	$6,639–7,224			
Pumped-storage hydroelectricity		$1,999–5,505		
Hydropower, conventional	$3,083	$2,574–16,283	$60–366	31–66%
Biomass	$4,524	$4,416	$144	64%
Geothermal power	$3,076	$6,753–46,223	$55–396	80–90%

Real life costs can diverge significantly from those estimates. Olkiluoto block 3, which achieved first criticality in late 2021 had an overnight cost to the construction consortium (the utility paid a fixed price agreed to when the deal was signed of only 3.2 billion euros) of €8.5 billion and a net electricity capacity of 1.6 GW or €5,310 per kW of capacity. Meanwhile Darlington Nuclear Generating Station in Canada had an overnight cost of CA$5.117 billion for a net electric capacity of 3512 MW or CA$1,457 per kW of capacity.

The oft cited figure of CA$14.319 billion – which works out to CA$4,077 per kW of capacity – includes interest (a particularly high cost in this case as the utility had to borrow at market rates and had to absorb the cost of delays in construction) and is thus not an "overnight cost". Furthermore, there is the issue of comparability of different sources of power, as capacity factors can be as low as 10–20% for some wind and solar applications reaching into the 50% range for offshore wind and finally above 90% for the most reliable nuclear power plants.

The average capacity factor of all commercial nuclear power plants in the world in 2020 was 80.3% (83.1% the prior year) but this includes outdated Generation II nuclear power plants and countries like France which run their nuclear power plants load following which reduces the capacity factor. Peaking power plants have particularly low capacity factors but make up for it by selling electricity at the highest possible price when supply does not meet demand otherwise.

The first German Offshore Wind Park Alpha Ventus Offshore Wind Farm with a nameplate capacity of 60 MW cost €2 million, after an initial estimate of €10 million. In 2012, it produced 268 GWh of electricity, achieving a capacity factor of just over 50%. If the overnight cost is calculated for the nameplate capacity, it works out to €4,167 per kW whereas if one takes into account the capacity factor, the figure needs to be roughly doubled.

Geothermal power is unique among renewables in that it usually has a low above-ground impact and is capable of baseload power generation as well as combined heat and power. However, depending on the plant and conditions underground naturally occurring radioactive materials such as radon may be released into the air. This partially offsets relatively high costs per capacity which were cited as US$200 million for the 45 MW first phase of Þeistareykir Geothermal Power Station and a total of US$330 million for the 90 MW combined two first phases. This gives a cost per kW of capacity of US$4,444 if only the first phase is considered and US$3,667 if the cost estimates for both phases together hold. The source also calls this power plant uniquely cost effective for geothermal power and the unique geology of Iceland makes the country one of the largest producers of geothermal power worldwide and by far the largest per capita or relative to all energy consumed.

Block 5 of Irsching Power Station in Southern Germany uses natural gas as fuel in a combined cycle, converting 1,750 megawatts of thermal energy to 847 net MW of usable electricity. It cost €450 million to build. This works out to some €531 per kW of capacity. However, due to the uneconomical prospect of operating it as a peaking power plant, the owners, soon after opening the plant in 2010, wanted to shut down the plant.

The LCOE of floating wind power increases with the distance from shore.

The Lieberose Photovoltaic Park – one of the largest in Germany – had a nameplate capacity at opening of 52.79 megawatt and cost some €160 million to build or €3,031 per kW. With a yearly output of some 52 GWh (equivalent to just over 5.9 MW) it has a capacity factor just over 11%. The €160 million figure was again cited when the solar park was sold in 2010.

The world's largest solar farm to date (2022) in Rajasthan, India – Bhadla Solar Park – has a total nameplate capacity of 2255 MW and cost a total of 98.5 billion Indian rupees to build. This works out to roughly 43681 rupees (€480) per kW.

As can be seen by these numbers, costs vary wildly even for the same source of electricity from place to place or time to time and depending on whether interest is included in total cost. Furthermore, capacity factors and the intermittency of certain power sources further complicate calculations. Another issue that is often omitted in discussions is the lifespan of various power plants – some of the oldest hydropower plants have existed for over a century, and nuclear power plants going on five or six decades of continuous operation are no rarity. However, with shorter designed operating lifetimes, wind turbines of the first generation have already started to be replaced with more modern wind turbines (termed "repowering"), or no longer fit into the current regulatory environment. Operating lifespans for some first-generation wind farms have been between 13 and 26 years with most targeting 20–30 years. Solar panels exhibit a certain ageing which limits their useful lifetime. Although real world data is limited, one study has suggested that panels still retain over 80% of their initial power after more than 30 years.

=== Operations and maintenance (O&M) costs ===
O&M costs include marginal costs of fuel, maintenance, operation, waste storage, and decommissioning for an electricity generation facility. Fuel costs tend to be highest for oil fired generation, followed in order by coal, gas, biomass and uranium. Due to the high energy density of uranium (or MOX fuel in plants that use this alternative to uranium) and the comparatively low price on the world uranium market (especially when measured in units of currency per unit of energy content), fuel costs only make up a fraction of the operating costs of nuclear power plants. In general, the cost balance between capital and running costs tilts in favour of lower operating expenses for renewables and nuclear and in the other direction for fossil fuels.

As sovereign debt in high income countries is usually to be had at lower interest rates than private loans, nuclear and renewable power become significantly cheaper – also compared to fossil alternatives – the bigger the involvement of state investment or state guarantees. In the Global South, where interest rates tend to be higher, the shorter construction period of small scale projects (particularly wind and solar) partially compensates for their increased capital cost. In terms of import substitution, solar can be particularly attractive in replacing bunker oil or diesel generators for rural electrification as it needs no imported hydrocarbons and as it allows hydrocarbon resources (where available) to be exported instead.

Short-term fluctuations in fuel prices can have significant effects on the cost of energy generation in natural gas and oil fired power plants and to a lesser extent for coal fired power plants. As renewable energies need no fuel, their costs are independent of world markets for fuels once built. Coal-fired power plants are often supplied with locally or at least domestically available coal – this is especially true for lignite whose low grade and high moisture content make transporting it over long distances uneconomical – and are thus less subject to the influence of world markets. If there is a carbon tax or other forms of CO_{2}-pricing, this can have a significant impact on the economic viability of fossil fuelled power plants. Due to the ease of stockpiling uranium and the rarity of refuelling (most Pressurized Water Reactors will change about a quarter to a third of their fuel loading every one and a half to two years), short term fluctuations in world uranium prices are a risk absorbed by fuel suppliers, not power plant operators. However, long-term trends in uranium price can have an effect of a few tenths of a cent to a cent or two per kilowatt-hour on the final price of nuclear energy.

The biggest factor in the operating costs of both nuclear and renewable are local wages – in most cases those need to be paid regardless of whether the plant is operating at full capacity or putting out only a fraction of its nameplate capacity and thus those plants are usually run to as high a fraction of their capacity as the market (negative prices) and weather (avoiding overheating rivers with cooling water, availability of sun or wind...) allow.

However, in France the nuclear power plants which provide some 70% of electricity demand are run load following to stabilize the grid. As a lot of home heating in France is supplied via electric means (heat pumps and resistive heating), there is a notable seasonality to nuclear energy generation in France with planned outages usually scheduled for the lower demand summer period, which also coincides with school holidays in France.

In Germany some two decades old and older wind turbines were shut down after no longer receiving renewable energy subsidies due to a reported market-rate electricity price of some €0.03 per kWh not covering marginal costs or only covering them as long as no major maintenance was needed. By contrast after being fully depreciated, Germany's (then remaining) nuclear power plants were described in media reports throughout the 2010s and into the early 2020s as highly profitable for their operators even without direct government subsidy.

=== Market matching costs ===
Many scholars, such as Paul Joskow, have described limits to the "levelized cost of electricity" metric for comparing new generating sources. In particular, LCOE ignores time effects associated with matching production to demand. This happens at two levels:

- Dispatchability, the ability of a generating system to come online, go offline, or ramp up or down, quickly as demand swings.
- The extent to which the availability profile matches or conflicts with the market demand profile.

Ramp rates, how fast the power can be increased or decreased, may be quicker for more modern nuclear and the economics of nuclear power plants differ. Nevertheless, capital intensive technologies such as wind, solar, and nuclear are economically disadvantaged unless generating at maximum availability since the LCOE is nearly all sunk-cost capital investment. Grids with very large amounts of intermittent power sources, such as wind and solar, may incur extra costs associated with needing to have storage or backup generation available. At the same time, intermittent sources can be even more competitive if they are available to produce when demand and prices are highest, such as solar during summertime mid-day peaks seen in hot countries where air conditioning is a major consumer.

Another limitation of the LCOE metric is the influence of energy efficiency and conservation (EEC). In the 2010s EEC caused the electricity demand of many countries, such as the US, to remain flat or decline. For solar systems installed at the point of end use, it may be more economical to invest in EEC first, then solar, or both at the same time. This results in a smaller required solar system than what would be needed without the EEC measures. This means that if energy conservation reduces overall demand, a specific power plant might run less often (at a lower capacity factor). Because fixed capital costs would then be spread over fewer kilowatt-hours, the LCOE of that specific plant increases.

The whole of system life cycle cost should therefore be considered, not just the LCOE of the energy source. LCOE is not as relevant to end-users than other financial considerations such as income, cashflow, mortgage, leases, rent, and electricity bills. Comparing solar investments in relation to these can make it easier for end-users to make a decision, or using cost-benefit calculations "and/or an asset's capacity value or contribution to peak on a system or circuit level".

=== External costs of energy sources ===
Typically pricing of electricity from various energy sources may not include all external costs – that is, the costs indirectly borne by society as a whole as a consequence of using that energy source. These may include enabling costs, environmental impacts, energy storage, recycling costs, or beyond-insurance accident effects.

Solar panel performance is usually guaranteed for 25 years and sometimes 30. According to a 2021 Harvard Business Review study costs of recycling solar panels will reach $20–30 per panel in 2035, which would increase the LCOE fourfold for PV solar power but only if panels are replaced after 15 years rather than the expected 30 years. If panels are replaced early this presents a significant policy challenge because if the recycling is made legal duty of the manufacturers (as it already is in the EU) it will dramatically reduce profit margins on this already competitive market.

A 2021 IEA study of repairing old panels to reuse rather than recycle them concluded that the financial viability depends on country specific factors such as grid tariffs, but that reuse is only likely for utility solar, as rooftop owners will want to make best use of space with more efficient new panels.

A 1995 to 2005 EU funded research study known as ExternE, or Externalities of Energy, found that the cost of producing electricity from coal or oil would double over its present value, and the cost of electricity production from gas would increase by 30% if external costs such as damage to the environment and to human health, from the particulate matter, nitrogen oxides, chromium VI, river water alkalinity, mercury poisoning and arsenic emissions produced by these sources, were taken into account. It was estimated in the study that these external, downstream, fossil fuel costs amount up to 1–2% of the EU's entire Gross Domestic Product (GDP), and this was before the external cost of global warming from these sources was even included.

Coal has the highest external cost in the EU, and global warming is the largest part of that cost. Sustainable energy avoids or greatly reduces future costs to society, such as respiratory illnesses. In 2022 the EU created a green taxonomy to indicate which energy investments reduce such external costs.

A means to address a part of the external costs of fossil fuel generation is carbon pricing—the method most favoured by economists for reducing global-warming emissions. Carbon pricing charges those who emit carbon dioxide for their emissions. That charge, called a "carbon price", is the amount that must be paid for the right to emit one tonne of carbon dioxide into the atmosphere. Carbon pricing usually takes the form of a carbon tax or a requirement to purchase permits to emit (also called "allowances").

Depending on the assumptions of possible accidents and their probabilities external costs for nuclear power vary significantly and can reach between 0.2 and 200 ct/kWh. Furthermore, nuclear power is working under an insurance framework that limits or structures accident liabilities in accordance with the Paris convention on nuclear third-party liability, the Brussels supplementary convention, and the Vienna convention on civil liability for nuclear damage and in the US the Price-Anderson Act. It is often argued that this potential shortfall in liability represents an external cost not included in the cost of nuclear electricity; but the cost is small, amounting to about 0.1% of the levelized cost of electricity, according to a 2008 study.

These beyond-insurance costs for worst-case scenarios are not unique to nuclear power, as hydroelectric power plants are similarly not fully insured against catastrophic events like a large dam failure. As private insurers base dam insurance premiums on limited scenarios, major disaster insurance in this sector is likewise provided by the state.

Because externalities are diffuse in their effect, external costs cannot be measured directly, but must be estimated.

==== International trade ====
Different countries charge generating companies differently for the negative externalities (such as pollution) that they create. To avoid unfair competition from imports of dirty electricity a tariff may be applied. For example, the UK and the EU may include electricity in their Carbon Border Adjustment Mechanisms. Alternatively the emissions trading systems (ETS) of the importing and exporting countries may be linked, or the generators in one country may be subject to the ETS of another country (for example Northern İreland generators are in the EU ETS).

=== Additional cost factors ===
Calculations often do not include wider system costs associated with each type of plant, such as long-distance transmission connections to grids, or balancing and reserve costs. Calculations do not necessarily include externalities such as health damage by coal plants, nor the effect of greenhouse emissions on the climate change, ocean acidification and eutrophication, ocean current shifts. Decommissioning costs of power plants are usually not included, is therefore not full cost accounting. Nuclear power plants in the United States are an exception, because the cost of decommissioning is included in the price of electricity per the Nuclear Waste Policy Act. These types of items can be explicitly added as necessary, depending on the purpose of the calculation.

Other non-financial factors may include:

- Comparisons of life-cycle greenhouse gas emissions show coal, for instance, to be radically higher in terms of GHGs than any alternative.
- Surface power density measures power per unit surface area using given technology, and can vary by several orders of magnitude between high- and low-density sources. Surface power density is a significant limiting factor in countries with high population density.
- Impacts on wildlife include an estimated 888,000 bats killed annually by collision with US wind turbines. Millions of birds are estimated to be killed or electrocuted each year by collision with high-voltage power lines and pylons, and millions more by fossil fuel power plants.
- Other environmental concerns with electricity generation include acid rain, ocean acidification and effect of coal extraction on watersheds.
- Various human health concerns with electricity generation, including asthma and smog, now dominate decisions in developed nations that incur health care costs publicly. A 2021 study estimated the health costs of coal power at hundreds of billions of dollars for the rest of the decade.

== Global studies ==
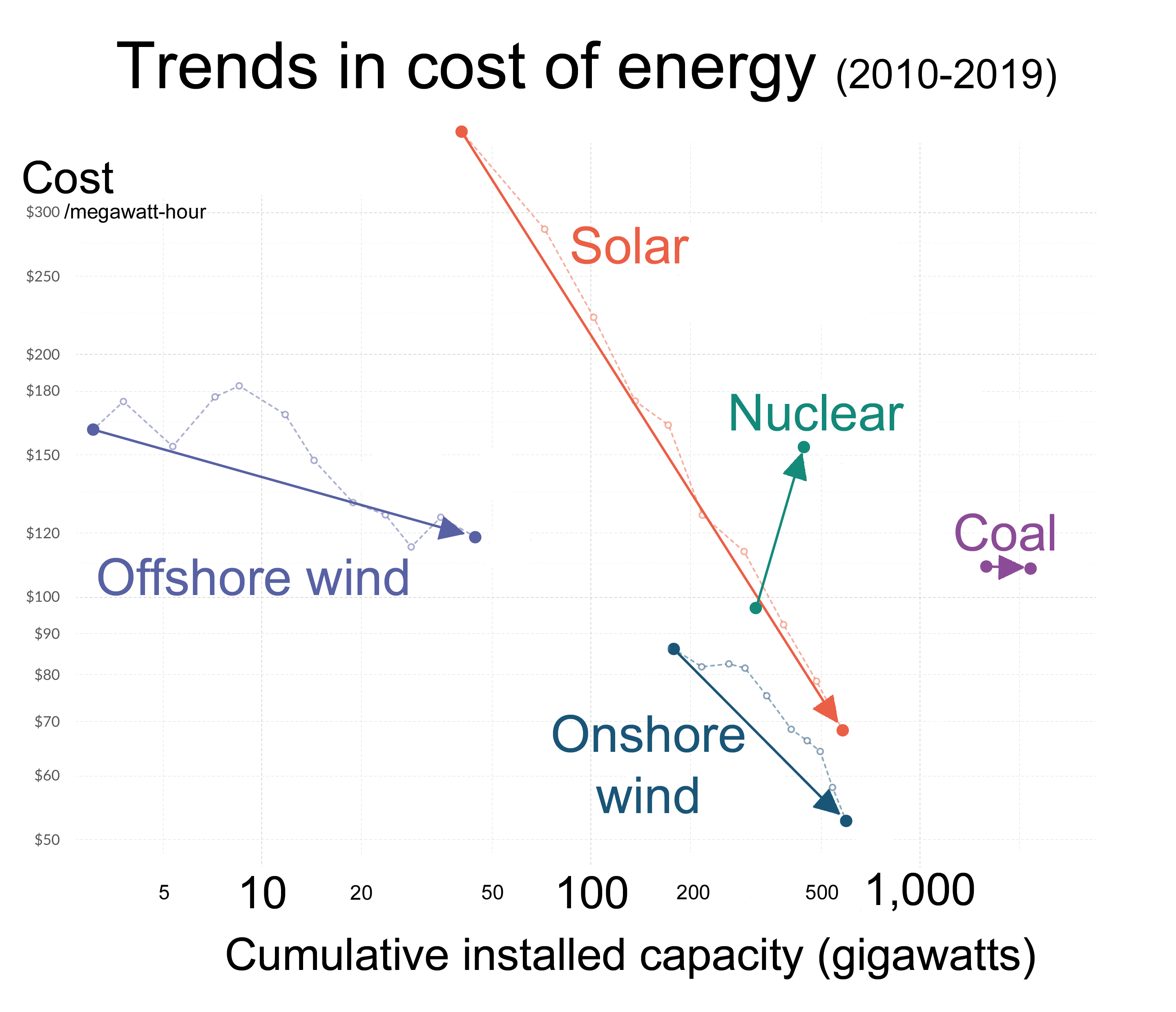
Levelized cost of energy based on different studies. Source: IRENA 2020 for renewables, Lazard for the price of electricity from nuclear (limited to the US Vogtle plant only) and coal, IAEA for nuclear capacity and Global Energy Monitor for coal capacity.

Global levelized cost of generation (US$ per MWh)
Source	IPCC 2014	IRENA 2020	NEA 2020	BNEF 2021
Discount rate	5%		7%	
PV (utility, fixed-axis)	110	68	56	39
PV (utility, tracking)	-	-	-	47
PV (residential)	150	164	126	-
Solar (thermal)	150	182	121	-
Wind, onshore	59	53	50	41
Wind, offshore	120	115	88	79
Nuclear new (existing)	65	-	69 (32)	-
Hydro	22	47	68	-
Geothermal	60	73	99	-
Coal (CC)	61	-	88 (110)	-
Gas CC (Peak)	71	-	71	-

=== Bank of America (2023) ===
In 2023, Bank of America conducted a LCOE study in which it postulated that existing LCOE estimates for renewables do not account for fossil fuel or battery backup and therefore levelized full system cost of electricity (LFSCOE) would be a more reasonable metric to compare sources in terms of providing firm power (24/365 guarantee of electricity supply without electricity consumers needing to curtail their demand due to high spot prices).

This study provides a model LFSCOE-95 which assumes 95% of generation is from the stated generation method and 5% is from alternative dispatchable generation methods. Also provided is a model LFSCOE-100 which assumes 100% of generation is from a stated generation method.

Levelized full system cost of electricity (LFSCOE, Bank of America 2022) in USD$/MWh
Type	EIA LCOE (2020)	LFSCOE-95		LFSCOE-100	
Type		Germany	Texas	Germany	Texas
Biomass	95	90	95	104	117
Coal (ultra-supercritical)	76	67	72	78	90
Natural Gas (combined cycle)	38	31	32	35	40
Natural Gas (combustion turbine)	67	36	37	39	42
Nuclear	82	90	96	106	122
Solar	36	849	177	1548	413
Wind	40	279	131	504	291
Wind and Solar	not supplied	220	97	454	225

=== BNEF (2021) ===
In March 2021, Bloomberg New Energy Finance found that "renewables are the cheapest power option for 71% of global GDP and 85% of global power generation. It is now cheaper to build a new solar or wind farm to meet rising electricity demand or replace a retiring generator, than it is to build a new fossil fuel-fired power plant. ... On a cost basis, wind and solar is the best economic choice in markets where firm generation resources exist and demand is growing." They further reported "the levelized cost of energy from lithium-ion battery storage systems is competitive with many peak-demand generators." BNEF does not disclose the detailed methodology and LCOE calculation assumptions, however, apart from declaring it is "derived from selected public sources". Costs of gas peakers are substantial, and include both the cost of fuel and external costs of its combustion. Costs of its combustion include emission of greenhouse gases carbon monoxide and dioxide, as well as nitrogen oxides (NO_{x}), which damage the human respiratory system and contribute to acid rain.

=== IEA & OECD NEA (2020) ===
In December 2020, IEA and OECD NEA published a joint Projected Costs of Generating Electricity study which looks at a very broad range of electricity generating technologies based on 243 power plants in 24 countries. The primary finding was that "low-carbon generation is overall becoming increasingly cost competitive" and "new nuclear power will remain the dispatchable low-carbon technology with the lowest expected costs in 2025". The report calculated LCOE with assumed 7% discount rate and adjusted for systemic costs of generation. The report also contains a modelling utility that produces LCOE estimates based on user-selected parameters such as discount rate, carbon price, heat price, coal price and gas price. The report's main conclusions:

- LCOE of specific energy sources significantly differs between countries due to their geographic, political and regulatory situation;
- low-carbon energy sources cannot be considered in separation, as they operate in "complex interactions" with each other to ensure reliable supply at all times; IEA analysis captures these interactions in value-adjusted LCOE or VALCOE;
- cost of renewable energy sources significantly decreased and are competitive (in LCOE terms) with dispatchable fossil fuel generation;
- cost of extension of operations of existing nuclear power plants (LTO, long-term operations) has the lowest LCOE of low-carbon energy sources;

=== IPCC (2014) ===
IPCC Fifth Assessment Report contains LCOE calculations for broad range of energy sources in the following four scenarios:

- 10% WACC, high full load hours (FLH), no carbon tax
- 5% WACC, high FLH, no carbon tax—scenario presented in the above table
- 10% WACC, low FLH, no carbon tax
- 10% WACC, high FLH, $100/tCO2eq carbon tax

== Regional studies ==
=== Australia ===
In 2020, BNEF estimated the following costs for electricity generation in Australia:

Australia LCoE 2020
Source	Solar	Wind onshore	Gas CC	Wind plus storage	Solar plus storage	Storage (4hr)	Gas peaker
Mean $US/MWh	47	58	81	87	118	156	228

=== China ===
China has the lowest cost of electricity generation of any country studied. As of early 2026, Chinese renewable energy costs have reached historic lows, undercutting both global averages and domestic coal-fired power. BNEF estimates that China's "manufacturing effect" allows it to produce power 11% to 64% cheaper than other markets, with 91% of new utility-scale renewables in 2024 cheaper than the cheapest fossil fuel alternative. Total installed costs for solar in China fell to approximately $691/kW in 2024, with projections to reach $388/kW by 2030. To maintain these low costs, China is shifting investment toward "smart infrastructure," with $88 billion earmarked for transmission and distribution in 2025 to handle the high volume of low-cost variable energy.

BNEF's February 2026 data showed battery storage costs also hitting record lows, making "solar + storage" projects in China competitive with traditional gas and coal peaking plants at roughly $57/MWh.

=== Europe ===
It can be seen from the following table that the cost of renewable energy, particularly photovoltaics, is falling very rapidly. As of 2017, the cost of electricity generation from photovoltaics, for example, has fallen by almost 75% within 7 years.

Electricity production costs of new power plants in €/MWh
Energy Source	Publication 2009	Publication 2011	Study 2012	Various individual data (as of 2012)	Study 2013	Study 2015	Study 2018	Study 2021
Nuclear	50 (Note: At an acquisition cost of 4.2 billion euros.)	60–100	–	70–90; 70–100; 105	–	36–84	–	–
Lignite	46–65 (Note: With or without free allocation of emission certificates.)	45–100 (Note: The source does not distinguish between lignite and hard coal.)	–	–	38–53	29–84	45.9–79.8	103.8–153.4
Hard Coal	49–68	45–100	–	–	63–80	40–116	62.7–98.6	110.3–200.4
Natural Gas (CCGT)	57–67	40–75	–	93	75–98	53–168	77.8–99.6	77.9–130.6
Hydro	–	–	–	–	–	22–108	–	–
Wind, onshore	93	50–130	65–81	60.35–111; 118	45–107	29–114	39.9–82.3	39.4–82.9
Wind, offshore	–	120–180	112–183	142–150	119–194	67–169	74.9–137.9	72.3–121.3
Biogas	–	–	–	126	135–215	–	101.4–147.4	72.2–172.6
Small-scale PV (Germany)	–	–	137–203	–	98–142	–	72.3–115.4	58.1–80.4
Large-Scale PV	32	–	107–167	100; 184	79–116	35–180	37.1–84.6	31.2–57

In the United Kingdom, a feed-in tariff of £92.50/MWh at 2012 prices (currently the equivalent of €131/MWh) plus inflation compensation was set in 2013 for the new nuclear power plant to be built at Hinkley Point C, with a term of 35 years. At that time, this was below the feed-in tariff for large photovoltaic and offshore wind plants and above onshore wind plants.

In Germany, the bidding processes that have been carried out since 2017 have led to significant cost reductions. In one bid for offshore wind farms, at least one bidder dispensed entirely with public subsidies and was prepared to finance the project through the market alone. The highest subsidy price that was still awarded was 6.00 ct/kWh. In a bid for onshore wind farm projects, an average payment of 5.71 ct/kWh was achieved, and 4.29 ct/kWh in a second bidding round.

In 2019, there were bids for new offshore wind farms in the United Kingdom, with costs as low as 3.96 pence per kWh (4.47 ct).

In 2019, there were bids in Portugal for photovoltaic plants, where the price for the cheapest project is 1.476 ct/kWh.

==== Poland ====
According to data from the Energy Market Agency, provided through the Ministry of Climate and Environment, the levelized technical unit costs of electricity generation by source within the Polish power system for the first three quarters of 2024 are as follows. These costs account for both fixed and variable costs, including fuel, but exclude costs related to CO_{2} emission allowances under the European Union Emissions Trading System (ETS), taxes, and sales costs.

Levelized technical unit costs of electricity generation by source; per MWh
Period Source	Q1–Q3 2024		
Period Source	PLN	EUR	USD
Hydro	175.1	40.92	36.55
Wind	192.0	44.87	40.08
Solar	194.8	45.53	40.66
Brown coal	223.3	52.19	46.61
Hard coal	441.5	103.18	92.16
Natural gas	443.6	103.67	92.60
Biomass	496.7	116.08	103.68

The publication of data has attracted several comments. Some have expressed concern that the values for renewables do not account for the additional costs associated with the necessary balancing of the system. Some have also noted the dispatchability issues inherent to renewables, which affect their ability to independently support the power grid. In addition, the economics of coal may be negatively impacted by the less frequent operation of coal-fired power plants as a result of the priority given to renewables on the grid.

Others have pointed out that the reported costs for coal do not account for the significant, multi-billion-dollar government subsidies for unprofitable coal mines as part of the government's commitment to a just transition policy. Some have remarked that the reported cost of coal also reflects cheaper imported coal in addition to more expensive domestically produced coal.

==== Britain (Note: Northern Ireland is part of the Irish grid) ====
As of 2022, gas is the largest source of electricity at 40%: its cost varies and being high carbon it causes climate change. So to reduce the share of gas the government annually auctions contracts for difference to build low-carbon generation capacity, mainly offshore wind. Before 2022 these generators had always received payments from electricity suppliers, but that year they started making payments. In other words renewables became subsidy free, partly due to the fall in cost of offshore wind. Instead of gas still dark weeks can be supplied by Norwegian hydropower or by nuclear. As many of Britain's existing nuclear reactors are due to retire soon the government hopes that cost effective small modular reactors can be developed.

==== France ====
The International Energy Agency and EDF have estimated the following costs. For nuclear power, they include the costs due to new safety investments to upgrade the French nuclear plant after the Fukushima Daiichi nuclear disaster; the cost for those investments is estimated at €4/MWh. Concerning solar power, the estimate of €293/MWh is for a large plant capable of producing in the range of 50–100 GWh/year located in a favourable location, such as in Southern Europe.

For a small household plant that can produce around 3 MWh/year, the cost is between 400 and €700/MWh, depending on location. Solar power was by far the most expensive renewable source of electricity among the technologies studied, although increasing efficiency and longer lifespan of photovoltaic panels together with reduced production costs have made this source of energy more competitive since 2011. By 2017, the cost of photovoltaic solar power had decreased to less than €50/MWh.

French LCOE in €/MWh (2017)
Technology	Cost in 2017
Hydro power	
Nuclear (with state-covered insurance costs)	50
Nuclear EPR	100
Natural gas turbines without CO_{2} capture	
Onshore wind	60
Solar farms	43.24

==== Germany ====
The Fraunhofer Institute for Solar Energy Systems publishes studies comparing the cost of different styles of energy production. The values for PV installations are based on the average cost between Northern and Southern Germany. The reports differentiate between the two and gives more details.

Levelized cost of electricity of energy technologies (€/MWh)
	2012	2013	2018	2021
PV rooftop (small)	170	120	93.85	84.1
PV rooftop (large)	-	-	-	72.1
PV ground (utility)	137	97.5	52.4	44.1
Wind, onshore	73	76	61.1	61.15
Wind, offshore	147.5	156.5	106.4	96.8
Biogas	-	120	124.4	128.55
Solid biomass	-	-	-	112.75
Lignite	-	45.5	62.85	128.6
Hard coal	-	71.5	80.65	155.35
Combined cycle gas turbine	-	86.5	88.7	104,25
Gas turbine	-	-	164.85	202.1

The LCOE for PV battery systems refers to the total amount of energy produced by the PV system minus storage losses. The storage losses are calculated based on the capacity of the battery storage, the assumed number of cycles and the efficiency of the battery. The results include differences in PV costs, battery costs (500 to 1200 EUR/kWh), and varying solar irradiation. For larger rooftop PV systems with battery storage, the battery costs between 600 and 1000 EUR/kWh.

For ground-mounted PV with battery storage systems, investment costs for battery storage of 500 to 700 EUR/kWh were assumed. The prices for smaller systems are in part lower, as these are standardized products, whereas larger battery systems tend to be individualized projects that additionally incur costs for project development, project management, and infrastructure. The range of investment costs is smaller for the larger sizes, as there is more competitive pressure.

Levelized cost of electricity of PV with battery storage (€/MWh)
	2021
PV rooftop (small, battery 1:1)	140.5
PV rooftop (large, battery 2:1)	104.9
PV ground (utility, battery 3:2)	75.8

=== Middle East ===
The capital investment costs, fixed and variable costs, and the average capacity factor of utility-scale wind and photovoltaic electricity supplies from 2000 to 2018 have been obtained using overall variable renewable electricity production of the countries in the Middle East and 81 examined projects.

Average capacity factor and LCOE of wind and PV electricity resources in the Middle East
Year	Capacity factor		LCOE ($/MWh)	
Year	Wind	Photovoltaic	Wind	Photovoltaic
2000	0.19	0.17	-	-
2001	-	0.17	-	-
2002	0.21	0.21	-	-
2003	-	0.17	-	-
2004	0.23	0.16	-	-
2005	0.23	0.19	-	-
2006	0.20	0.15	-	-
2007	0.17	0.21	-	-
2008	0.25	0.19	-	-
2009	0.18	0.16	-	-
2010	0.26	0.20	107.8	-
2011	0.31	0.17	76.2	-
2012	0.29	0.17	72.7	-
2013	0.28	0.20	72.5	212.7
2014	0.29	0.20	66.3	190.5
2015	0.29	0.19	55.4	147.2
2016	0.34	0.20	52.2	110.7
2017	0.34	0.21	51.5	94.2
2018	0.37	0.23	42.5	85.8
2019	-	0.23	-	50.1

=== Turkey ===
As of March 2021 for projects starting generating electricity in Turkey from renewable energy in Turkey in July feed-in-tariffs in lira per kWh are: wind and solar 0.32, hydro 0.4, geothermal 0.54, and various rates for different types of biomass: for all these there is also a bonus of 0.08 per kWh if local components are used. Tariffs will apply for 10 years and the local bonus for 5 years. Rates are determined by the presidency, and the scheme replaces the previous USD-denominated feed-in-tariffs for renewable energy.

=== Japan ===
A 2010 study by the Japanese government (pre-Fukushima disaster), called the Energy White Paper, concluded the cost for kilowatt hour was ¥49 for solar, ¥10 to ¥14 for wind, and ¥5 or ¥6 for nuclear power.

In 2011, Masayoshi Son, an advocate for renewable energy, pointed out that the government estimates for nuclear power did not include the costs for reprocessing the fuel or disaster insurance liability. Son estimated that if these costs were included, the cost of nuclear power was about the same as wind power.

In 2020, the cost of solar in Japan had decreased to between ¥13.1/kWh to ¥21.3/kWh (on average, ¥15.3/kWh, or $0.142/kWh).

The cost of a solar PV module make up the largest part of the total investment costs. As per the 2021 analysis of Solar Power Generation Costs in Japan, module unit prices fell sharply. In 2018, the average price was close to 60,000 yen/kW, but by 2021 it is estimated at 30,000 yen/kW, so cost was reduced by almost half.

=== United States ===
==== Lazard (2020–2023) ====
Since October 2020, the financial firm Lazard had been comparing renewable and conventional sources of energy, including comparison between existing and new generation. The Lazard study assumes "60% debt at 8% interest rate and 40% equity at 12% cost" for its LCOE calculation but did not disclose their methodology or project portfolio used to calculate prices. Since 2023 Lazard added a footnote explaining their LCOE estimates for nuclear power are "based on the then-estimated costs of the Vogtle Plant and US-focused".

Lazard cost of generation (US$ per MWh)
	2023
PV (utility, fixed-axis)	24–96
PV (utility, tracking)	-
PV (residential)	117–282
Solar (thermal)	-
Wind, onshore	24–75
Wind, offshore	72–140
Nuclear new (existing)	141–221* (31)
Hydro	-
Geothermal	61-102
Coal (CC)	68–166
Gas CC (Peak)	115–221

==== Energy Information Administration (2020) ====
Since 2010, the US Energy Information Administration (EIA) has published the Annual Energy Outlook (AEO), with yearly LCOE projections for future utility-scale facilities to be commissioned in about five years' time.

The following data are from the Energy Information Administration's (EIA) Annual Energy Outlook released in 2020 (AEO2020). They are in dollars per megawatt-hour (2019 USD/MWh). These figures are estimates for plants going into service in 2025, exclusive of tax credits, subsidies, or other incentives. The LCOE below is calculated based on a 30-year recovery period using a real after tax weighted average cost of capital (WACC) of 6.1%. For carbon intensive technologies 3 percentage points are added to the WACC. (This is approximately equivalent to a fee of $15 per metric ton of carbon dioxide CO_{2}.) Federal tax credits and various state and local incentive programs would be expected to reduce some of these LCOE values. For example, EIA expects the federal investment tax credit program to reduce the capacity weighted average LCOE of solar PV built in 2025 by an additional $2.41, to $30.39.

The electricity sources which had the most decrease in estimated costs over the period 2010 to 2019 were solar photovoltaic (down 88%), onshore wind (down 71%) and advanced natural gas combined cycle (down 49%).

For utility-scale generation put into service in 2040, the EIA estimated in 2015 that there would be further reductions in the constant-dollar cost of concentrated solar power (CSP) (down 18%), solar photovoltaic (down 15%), offshore wind (down 11%), and advanced nuclear (down 7%). The cost of onshore wind was expected to rise slightly (up 2%) by 2040, while natural gas combined cycle electricity was expected to increase 9% to 10% over the period.

Historical summary of EIA's LCOE projections (2010–2020)
Estimate in $/MWh			Coal convent'l	Nat. gas combined cycle		Nuclear advanced	Wind		Solar	
of year	ref	for year	Coal convent'l	convent'l	advanced	Nuclear advanced	onshore	offshore	PV	CSP
2010		2016	100.4	83.1	79.3	119.0	149.3	191.1	396.1	256.6
2011		2016	95.1	65.1	62.2	114.0	96.1	243.7	211.0	312.2
2012		2017	97.7	66.1	63.1	111.4	96.0	N/A	152.4	242.0
2013		2018	100.1	67.1	65.6	108.4	86.6	221.5	144.3	261.5
2014		2019	95.6	66.3	64.4	96.1	80.3	204.1	130.0	243.1
2015		2020	95.1	75.2	72.6	95.2	73.6	196.9	125.3	239.7
2016		2022	NB	58.1	57.2	102.8	64.5	158.1	84.7	235.9
2017		2022	NB	58.6	53.8	96.2	55.8	NB	73.7	NB
2018		2022	NB	48.3	48.1	90.1	48.0	124.6	59.1	NB
2019		2023	NB	40.8	40.2	NB	42.8	117.9	48.8	NB
2020		2025	NB	36.61	36.61	NB	34.10	115.04	32.80	NA
Nominal change 2010–2020			NB	−56%	−54%	NB	−77%	-40%	−92%	NB

Note: Projected LCOE are adjusted for inflation and calculated on constant dollars based on two years prior to the release year of the estimate.
Estimates given without any subsidies. Transmission cost for non-dispatchable sources are on average much higher. NB = "Not built" (No capacity additions are expected.)

== See also ==
- Electricity pricing
- Life-cycle greenhouse gas emissions of energy sources
- Distributed generation
- Economics of nuclear power
- Demand response
- Variable renewable energy
- Levelized cost of water
- National Grid Reserve Service
- Nuclear power in France
- List of thermal power station failures
- Calculating the cost of the UK Transmission network: Estimating cost per kWh of transmission
- List of countries by renewable electricity production
- Environmental impact of electricity generation
- Grid parity
