= Fus =

Fus or FUS may refer to:

== Medicine ==
- RNA-binding protein FUS, an oncogene and protein
- Feline urologic syndrome, in cats
- Focused ultrasound

== Organisations ==
- Fath Union Sport, a football club in Rabat, Morocco
- Fire Underwriters Survey, a Canadian risk management company
- First Unitarian Society of Madison, a church in Madison, Wisconsin, United States
- First Unitarian Society of Minneapolis, a church in Minneapolis, Minnesota, United States
- Franciscan University of Steubenville, a private Catholic university in Steubenville, Ohio, United States
- Franklin University Switzerland, a private liberal arts university in Lugano, Switzerland
- Frente Único Socialista (Socialist Single Front) (1938), a temporary political alliance in Bolivia

== Other uses ==
- Fuck U Skrillex You Think Ur Andy Warhol but Ur Not!! <3, an album by Skrillex
- Field upgrade software, for embedded systems
