= AIR Worldwide =

Risk management software company

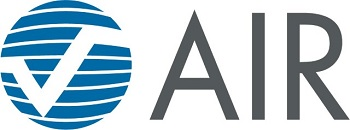
- Formerly: AIR Worldwide
- Type: Subsidiary
- Industry: Catastrophe modeling, Enterprise risk management, Extreme event risk analysis
- Founded: 1987; 39 years ago
- Fate: Acquired
- Successor: Verisk Extreme Event Solutions
- Headquarters: Boston, Massachusetts, United States
- Key people: Rob Newbold (president)
- Products: Touchstone; ARC; Arium; Synergy Studio
- Parent: Verisk Analytics
- Website: air-worldwide.com

AIR Worldwide was an American risk modeling and data analytics company based in Boston, Massachusetts that was acquired by Verisk Analytics in 2022.

It had customers in insurance, reinsurance, financial services, and government markets. AIR Worldwide specialized in catastrophe modeling software and services to manage the probability of loss from natural catastrophes, terrorism, pandemics, casualty catastrophes, and cyber incidents. After the acquisition these services continued under the name Verisk Extreme Event Solutions.

== History ==
Karen Clark, the developer of the first commercial hurricane catastrophe model, founded Applied Insurance Research in 1987, with CATMAP as its first product introduced later that same year. CATMAP provided a catastrophe loss analysis system for treaty insurers and reinsurers in particular. In late August 1992, AIR published results from its U.S. Hurricane Model that estimated insured losses for Hurricane Andrew's landfall in southern Florida could come to surpass $13 billion. The estimate, which was met with skepticism at the time, was later validated by insurance claims and renewed interest in catastrophe modeling for estimating risk due to extreme events "almost overnight." Over ten major insurance companies faced insolvency as a result of Hurricane Andrew alone.

Applied Insurance Research was privately held until it was acquired by ISO in 2002 and renamed AIR Worldwide; Verisk Analytics later formed as a parent holding company for ISO. Analyze Re, a software analytics provider for the reinsurance and insurance industries, became a part of AIR's operational domain in 2016, and then Arium, a company specializing in liability risk modeling, followed in 2017.

In January 2022, AIR Worldwide transitioned to the Verisk brand and is now Verisk Extreme Event Solutions.

Subsequently, alongside the release of Verisk Synergy Studio, Verisk Extreme Event Solutions rebranded to Verisk Catastrophe & Risk Solutions.
