= Overnight cost =

Interest-free construction project cost

Overnight cost is the cost of a construction project if no interest was incurred during construction, as if the project was completed "overnight."

This concept is used for providing a simplistic cost comparison between power plant projects or technologies, through a ratio with the maximum power the plant can deliver.

== Power generation ==
The overnight capital cost is a term used in the power generation industry.

It is usually computed by dividing the overnight cost of building the plant by the maximum instantaneous power the plant can deliver. This overnight capital cost does not take into account:

- the life span of a plant or its key components,
- the capacity factor, i.e. the ratio between the effective mean power (actually delivered through the year) and the maximum power (maybe reached only a few hours per year) which typically varies from 10% (e.g. solar plants in Germany) to 90% (e.g. nuclear plants in USA) due to various causes : natural such as sun, clouds, wind or waterfall, technological such as maintenance constraints, financial such as fuel cost vs. electricity wholesale price, legal such as pollution reduction,
- the financing costs or escalation, noticeably the discount due to some interest rate or the comparative return of capital in other industries.

Hence :

- the overnight capital cost is not an actual estimate of construction cost,
- investors in the energy industry typically look rather to the levelized cost of energy (LCOE) for comparing generation projects or technologies (e.g. solar power, natural gas) in the long term, as it includes ongoing fuel, maintenance, operation and financial costs.

The U.S. Department of Energy tracks and makes publicly available levelized cost of energy figures for competing technologies. These figures will vary substantially in other countries due to different energy policies and domestic energy sources.

== See also ==
- Economics of new nuclear power plants
