= Verisk Analytics =

American data analytics and risk assessment firm

Verisk Analytics, Inc.

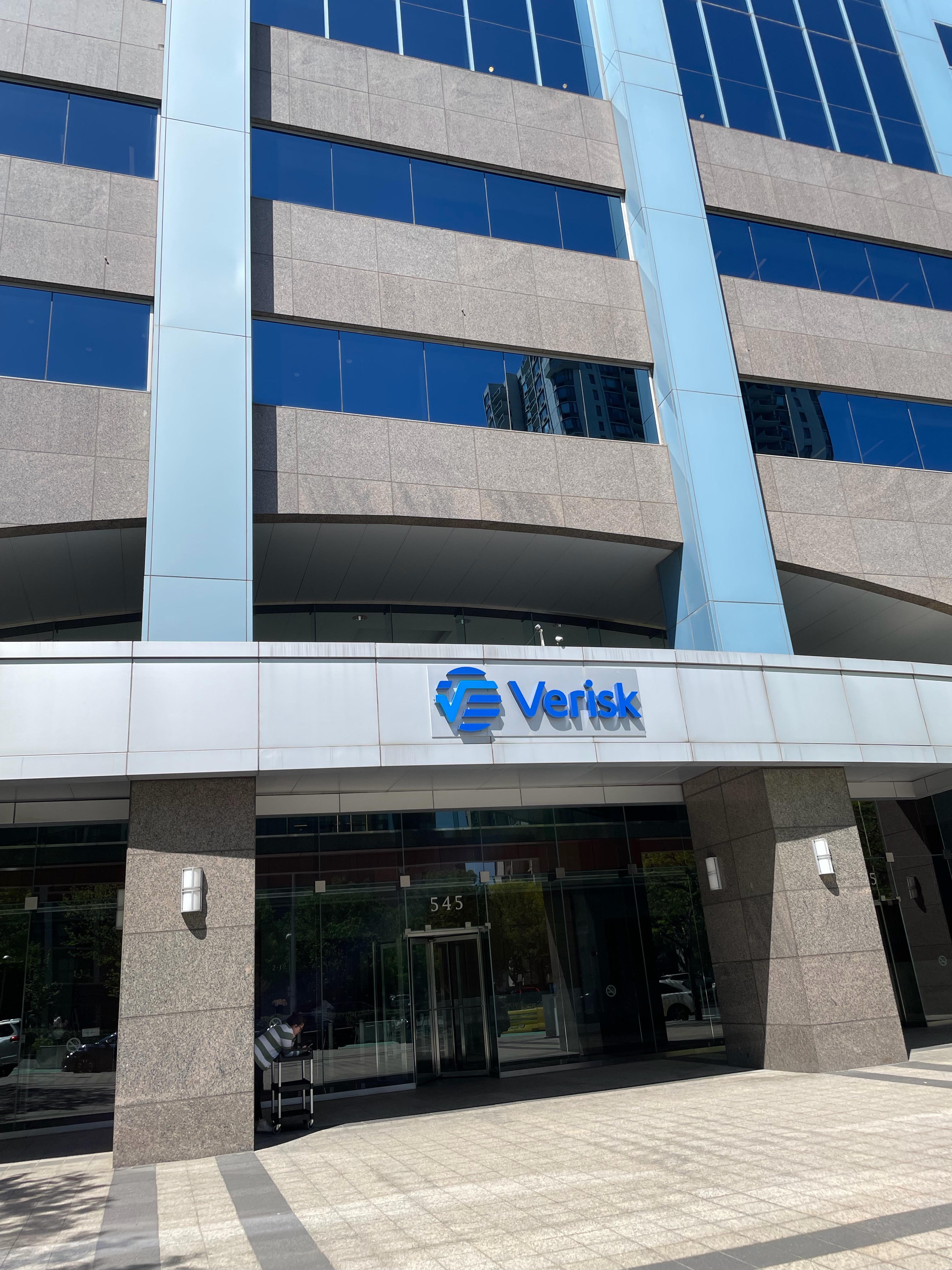
- Headquarters in Jersey City, New Jersey
- Type: Public
- Traded as: Nasdaq: VRSK; S&P 500 component
- Industry: Data analytics and risk assessment
- Founded: 1971; 55 years ago
- Headquarters: Jersey City, New Jersey, U.S.
- Key people: Lee Shavel (CEO); Bruce Hansen (chair)
- Revenue: ▲US$3.07 billion (2025)
- Operating income: ▲US$1.34 billion (2025)
- Net income: ▼US$908 million (2025)
- Total assets: ▲US$6.19 billion (2025)
- Total equity: ▲US$310 million (2025)
- Number of employees: 8,000 (2025)
- Subsidiaries: AIR Worldwide; Insurance Services Office; Maplecroft; Xactware
- Website: www.verisk.com

Verisk Analytics, Inc. is an American multinational data analytics and risk assessment firm based in Jersey City, New Jersey. The company's services include fraud prevention, actuarial science, insurance coverage, fire protection, catastrophe and weather risk, and data management.

The company was privately held until an initial public offering on October 6, 2009, which raised $1.9 billion, making it the largest IPO in the United States for the year.

== History ==
The company's Insurance Services Office (ISO) subsidiary was created in 1971 through the consolidation of various property/casualty insurance bureaus.

In 2009, Verisk completed its IPO and became a publicly traded company. The firm did not raise any funds for itself in the IPO, which was designed to provide an opportunity for the firm's casualty and property insurer owners to sell some or all of their holdings and to provide a market price for those retaining their shares. The 2009 IPO was priced at $22 per share for 85.25 million shares owned by its shareholders, including American International Group, The Hartford and Travelers, making it the largest since the 2008 IPO for Visa Inc. In an action described by investment research company Morningstar as a "vote of confidence" in Verisk, Berkshire Hathaway was the only company among the firm's largest shareholders that did not sell any of its stock in the October 2009 IPO.

== Mergers and acquisitions ==
In 2010, Verisk acquired 3E Company, a provider of services that help customers comply with government-mandated environmental health and safety requirements.

In 2012, Verisk acquired Argus & Advisory Services, a provider of competitive benchmarking, analytics, and customized services to financial institutions and regulators in North America, Latin America, and Europe. Also in 2012, Verisk acquired Aspect Loss Prevention, a loss prevention software developer for retail, entertainment, and food industries; and MediConnect Global, Inc., which develops software for medical records aggregation and analysis.

In 2014, Verisk acquired Maplecroft, a provider of global risk analytics and advisory services, and Dart, a provider of benchmarking financial services for companies operating in Australia, New Zealand, and other Asia-Pacific markets. Then in 2015, Verisk acquired Wood Mackenzie, a data analytics and commercial intelligence company for energy, chemicals, metals, and mining industries, in a deal valued at $2.8 billion.

Verisk acquired PowerAdvocate, a provider of data analytics and consulting services for the utilities and oil & gas industries, in 2017 for approximately $280 million. In August 2017, Verisk acquired Sequel, an insurance and reinsurance software specialist based in London. Verisk also currently owns and operates Atmospheric and Environmental Research (AER), a research agency headquartered in Lexington, Massachusetts. AER conducts environmental studies with a focus on weather and climate research in order to provide risk assessment and analysis for various clients such as NOAA, NASA, and the United States Armed Forces.

In 2020, Verisk acquired Jornaya, a consumer behavioral data provider, Infutor, an identity resolution and consumer data company, and Contact State, a lead generation platform, to form Verisk Marketing Solutions.

In November 2021, Verisk acquired Data Driven Safety, a public record data aggregation firm that specializes in driver risk assessment in the United States.

In December 2022, Verisk announced that it had entered into an agreement to acquire Mavera, a Sweden-based insurtech firm that operates a personal injury claims management platform. In the same year, Verisk also acquired Opta, a Canadian provider of property intelligence and innovative technology solutions, owner of Fire Underwrriters Survey. It also acquired Pruvan, a provider of field-to-office management solutions for property preservation and construction professionals. Verisk also sold its financial services business to TransUnion for $515 million USD and sold Wood Mackenzie to Veritas Capital for $3.1 billion USD in the same year.

In 2025, Verisk acquired Nasdaq Risk Modelling for Catastrophes, a SaaS platform where specialized model partners make their models, hazard data and analytics available to the industry to help assess and address the global insurance protection gap, and SuranceBay, a provider of producer licensing, onboarding, appointment and compliance solutions for the life and annuity industry.
