= Wood Mackenzie =

Global research and consultancy firm

Wood Mackenzie Limited
- Type: Private
- Industry: Research and consulting firm supplying data, written analysis, and consultancy advice on energy, chemicals, renewables, metals, and mining.
- Founded: 1923; 103 years ago
- Headquarters: Edinburgh, Scotland, United Kingdom
- Area served: Worldwide
- Key people: Jason Liu (CEO)
- Services: Consulting, research, and analytics
- Owner: Veritas Capital (2023–present)
- Number of employees: 2,500
- Website: woodmac.com

Wood Mackenzie, also known as WoodMac, is a global research and consultancy group supplying data, written analysis, and consultancy advice to the energy, chemicals, renewables, metals, and mining industries.

In 2015, the company was acquired by Verisk Analytics, an American data analytics and risk assessment firm, in a deal valued at $2.8 billion.^{[5]} The company was taken private by private-equity firm Veritas Capital in 2023, in a deal valued at $3.1 billion.^{[6][7]}

== History ==
Originally founded in Edinburgh and also headquartered in Edinburgh, it has over 30 offices worldwide. Originally established as stockbroker in 1923, the company's energy business was launched in 1973, when it started reviewing the North Sea oilfields.^{[8]} Between 2007 and 2014, Wood Mackenzie acquired coal specialists Hill & Associates in the US, Barlow Jonker in Australia, and Brook Hunt, the UK-based metals analysts.^{[9][10][11]}

Since 2015 a host of companies have become part of Wood Mackenzie including PSG, a petroleum database service; PCI, the specialist chemicals analysis group; Greentech Media, providing analysis of the solar market; ^{[12]} MAKE, providing analysis of global wind power; Roskill a global metals and mining research firm that focused on the materials crucial for the energy transition; Infield Systems And PowerAdvocate with its unique cost and supply chain analytics.

=== Detailed history ===
1973: North Sea Service, Wood Mackenzie's first industry research offering, was launched

1986: Wood Mackenzie purchased by Hill Samuel, the UK merchant bank

1987: Hill Samuel was acquired by TSB and sold Wood Mackenzie to County NatWest

1997: NatWest sold its European equities business, including Wood Mackenzie, to Bankers Trust

1999: Bankers Trust (including Wood Mackenzie) purchased by Deutsche Bank

2001: Management and employee buy-out from Deutsche Bank backed by the Bank of Scotland

2005: Refinancing deal, involving Candover Partners acquiring equity through the exit of Bank of Scotland

2007: Creation of coal team via acquisitions of Hill & Associates and Barlow Jonker. Divestment of Life Sciences division

2008: Creation of metals team via acquisition of Brook Hunt

2009: Refinancing deal, involving Charterhouse Capital Partners acquiring the majority equity stake in the business through the exit of Candover

2010: Acquisition of PetroPlan Refinery Model

2012: Refinancing deal, involving Hellman & Friedman acquiring majority shareholding whilst Charterhouse Capital Partners retained a minority stake.

2015: Acquisition of Deloitte's Petroleum Services Group (PSG), a specialised oil and gas information business including a database of Exploration & Production (E&P) information

2015: Acquisition of Wood Mackenzie by Verisk Analytics

2015: Acquisition of Infield Systems, an independent provider of business intelligence, analysis, and research to the oil, gas, and associated marine industries

2015: Acquisition of PCI Chemicals, a chemicals business that offers integrated data and subscriptions research in the chemicals, fibers, films, and plastics sectors

2016: Acquisition of Greentech Media, an information services provider for the electricity and renewables sector

2017: Acquisition of MAKE providing knowledge of the global onshore and offshore wind power market

2019: Acquisition of Genscape, a global provider of real-time data and intelligence for commodity and energy markets, by Verisk becoming part of Wood Mackenzie to enhance its leading research and consultancy across the natural resources sectors

2022: Acquisition of Wood Mackenzie by Veritas Capital

2026: Acquisition of LandGate by Wood Mackenzie and Veritas Capital
