= Society for Information Management =

Professional society

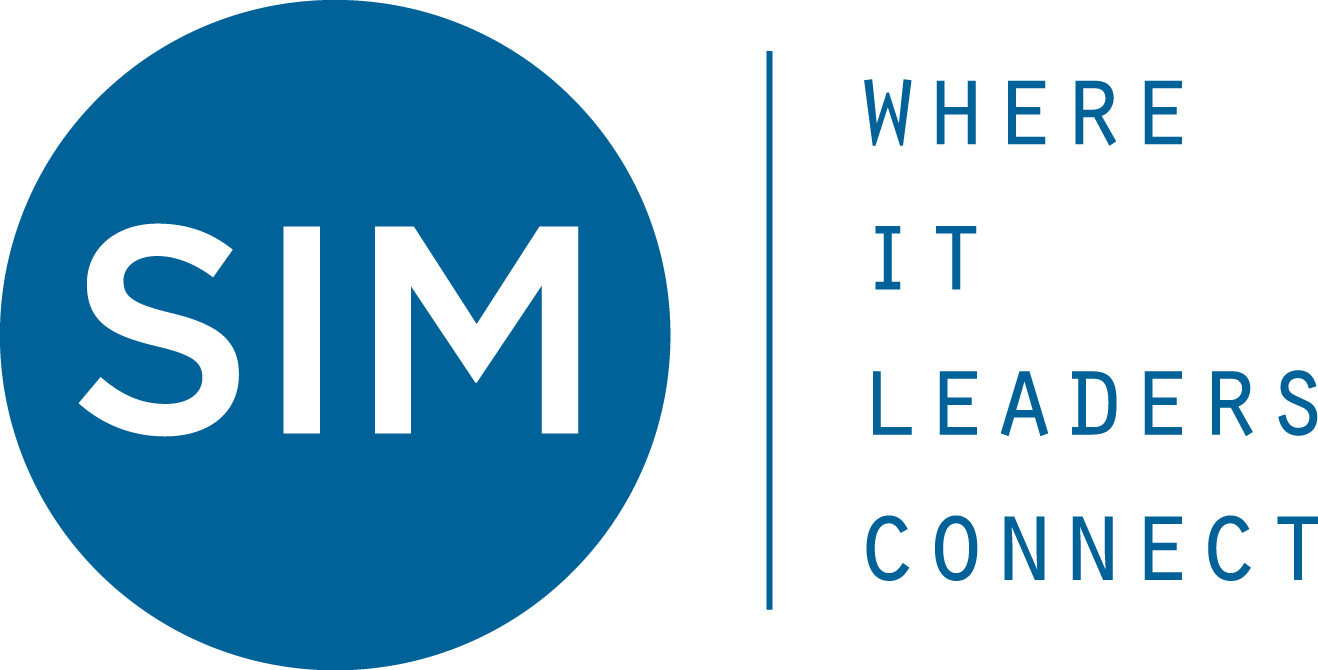
- Formation: 1968
- Type: Professional association
- Headquarters: Mount Laurel, New Jersey
- Location: United States, Canada
- Members: 5,000
- Official language: English
- Chief Executive: Mark Taylor
- Affiliations: 40 chapters
- Website: www.simnet.org

Society for Information Management (SIM) is a professional organization of over 5,000 senior information technology (IT) executives, chief information officers, prominent academicians, selected consultants, and others.

== History ==
Society for Information Management Logo (prior to 2014)

Society for the Management of Information Systems Logo (prior to 1982)

The idea of SIM began during a break session at the Association for Computing Machinery (ACM) conference held in Las Vegas in August 1968. A conversation between Robert Head with the Software Resource Group and Herb Schwartz with the United States Atomic Energy Commission ensued on how current professional societies did not emphasize the managerial aspects of computing enough nor did they serve as a good communication mechanism between data processing managers and executive managers. That conversation was the basis for the formation of The Society for Management Information Systems (SMIS) which in 1982 became the Society for Information Management.

A founding committee was formed and the first meeting was held on November 22, 1968, at the U.S. Atomic Energy Commission in Washington D.C. The founders included Joseph P. Cunningham, Richard E. Dooley, Dr. James C. Emory, Robert B. Forest, Robert V. Head, Dr. Alan J. Rowe, James G. Rude, M.H. Schwartz, Robert G. Stevens, W. Robert Widener and Robert K. Wilmouth.

The first (founding) conference titled "Bridging the Gap Between the Management Function and Information Technology" with 250 attendees was held at the University of Minnesota on September 8–9, 1969.

=== Current and past presidents or chairs ===
1969 Robert V. Head
1970 Robert V. Head
1971 M.H Schwartz
1972 Dr. James C. Emery
1973 Richard E. Dooley
1974 Gerald M. Hoffman
1975 James G. Rude
1976 Dr. Daniel Teichroew
1977 Herbert Z. Halbrecht
1978 Reed Phillips
1979 Richard E. Mahin
1980 Dr. C.W. Getz
1981 Robert J. Jirout
1982 Frederick S. Haines
1983 Darwin A. John
1984 Dr. Robert A. Rouse
1985 Carl C. Williams
1986 Peter W.C. Mather
1987 Thomas E. Morin
1988 Paul Berger 1989 John M. Hammitt
1990 Larry Burdin
1991 John Owens
1992 Patricia Wallington
1993 Robert Rubin
1994 Warren Harkness
1995 Harvey Shrednick
1996 James Kinney
1998 John Stevenson
1999 June Drewry
| 2000 June Drewry
2001 Raymond Hoving
2002 Steve Finnerty
2003 Ed Trainor
2004 Nancy Markle
2005 Dave Luce
2006 Stephen Pickett
2007 Jim Noble
2008 Bob Keefe
2009 Peter Whatnell
2010 Patricia Coffey
2011 Patricia Coffey
2012 Jim Knight
2013 Jim Knight
2014 Eric Gorham
2015 Eric Gorham
2016 Kevin More
2017 Kevin More
2018 Caren Shiozaki
2019 Caren Shiozaki
2020 Joel Schwalbe
2021 Joel Schwalbe
2022 Leo Pellerin
2023 Leo Pellerin
2024 Joseph Bruin

== Governance ==
=== Advanced Practices Council ===
Advanced Practices Council (APC) is a forum for senior IT executives who commission exclusive research and share cross-industry perspectives. APC was founded in 1991 by Warren McFarlan of the Harvard Business School.

=== Annual conference ===
From 1995 to 2002, the conference was called SIM Interchange Annual Conference.

From 2003 to 2016, the conference was called SIMposium.

From 2017 to 2020, the conference was called SIM Connect Live.

In 2021, SIM partnered with TechServe Alliance to host the first-ever SIM TechExec (formerly Executive Retreat) in Amelia Island, Florida. The two organizations co-hosted the IT & Engineering Talent Forum, a collaborative deep-dive exploration of the perennial talent challenge in IT & engineering staffing.

Host Cities

1969 Minneapolis, MN
1970 Washington, D.C.
1971 Denver, CO
1972 Montreal, Quebec
1973 Chicago, IL
1974 San Francisco, CA
1975 New York, NY
1976 Chicago, IL
1977 Los Angeles, CA
1978 Washington, D.C
1979 Minneapolis, MN
1980 Philadelphia, PA
1981 Denver, CO
1982 Chicago, IL
1983 San Diego, CA
1984 Chicago, IL
1985 Boston, MA
1986 Dallas, TX
1987 Seattle, WA
1988 Minneapolis, MN 1989 Atlanta, GA
1990 New York, NY
1991 Chicago, IL
1992 Los Angeles, CA
1993 Washington, D.C.
1994 Salt Lake City, UT
1995 Boston, MA*
1996 San Francisco, CA
1997 Boston, MA

- 1995 Hosted by the Boston Chapter at Disney World, Orlando, FL

1998 Seattle, WA
1999 Atlanta, GA
2000 San Diego, CA
2001 Philadelphia, PA
2002 Salt Lake City, UT
2003 New York, NY
2004 Chicago, IL
2005 Boston, MA
2006 Dallas, TX
2007 Memphis, TN
2008 Orlando, FL
2009 Seattle, WA
2010 Atlanta, GA
2011 Orlando, FL
2012 Dallas, TX
2013 Boston, MA
2014 Denver, CO
2015 Charlotte, NC
2016 Mohegan Sun, CT
2018 Dallas, TX

2019 Orlando, FL

2020 Austin, TX Rescheduled to Virtual SIM National Executive Retreat
2021 - Amelia Island, FL
2022 - Palm Springs, CA
SIM TechExec
2023 - Amelia Island, FL
2024 - Scottsdale, AZ

=== SIM Women ===
SIM Women is a network inside the Society for Information Management to promote communication, mentorship and career development amongst the female members.

In January 2007 SIM Women began with the New Jersey, NY Metro and Fairfield-Westchester chapters. In April 2007 the ladies of Philadelphia were added, and in February 2008 the ladies of Boston joined SIM Women as well. There was great participation from each new chapter. In May 2008 the ladies from Central CT and the DC/Capital area were added. In August 2008 the ladies of the Toronto and Raleigh chapters joined. In September 2008 the ladies of Tennessee, Central and South Florida chapters were asked to participate, and Atlanta and Alabama joined in October. In December 2008 the Wisconsin, Minnesota, St. Louis, and Northeast Ohio chapters were welcomed. In January 2009 ladies of Houston, Dallas-Fort Worth, and Indianapolis joined the ranks. Chicago and Detroit ladies joined in the spring of 2009. SIM women continued to add chapters every month and covered every SIMI chapter by June 2009.

To date, SIM Women has held monthly conference calls and multiple successful networking events. SIM Women’s conference calls are typically the last Wednesday of the month at 3:00 pm EST. Executive coaches, successful CIOs, and networking gurus are brought in to facilitate the calls and meetings. Topics covered included: Personal Branding, Peer Communication, Defining Your Personal Success, Internal Networking, Personal Accountability, Industry Visibility, and Mentoring Defined. SIM Women also rotates face-to-face networking events around the country.

=== SIM Leadership Institute ===
The SIM Leadership Institute was formed in 2021 to offer leadership programs for everyone, at every stage of their career. Programs include the Rising Leaders Forum, the Executive Leaders Forum, Next Level Tech Manager and Leadership Foundations.

=== Rising Leaders Forum (RLF) ===
Rising Leaders Forum (RLF) is an intensive, ten-month leadership development program focused on creating authentic leaders. Since 1992 over 3000 graduates and more than 300 sponsors have found RLF the key to developing leadership effectiveness. RLF offers a curriculum of intense reading, open exchanges on leadership practices, and interactive learning focusing on team-building, creative thinking and listening skills.

Founded by Richard Dooley, the first RLF was held in Chicago in 1992 and was originally called the "SIM Chapter-Hosted Learning Forum".

=== Leadership Foundations ===
SIM's Leadership Foundations offering is a 100% online program. It is an orientation for first-time leaders needing greater familiarity with key skills required to be an effective leader in IT. The program is entirely customized to focus on an individual's specific areas of necessary leadership development.

== Local chapters and leadership ==
The strength of the SIM Organization is built around local its local Chapters. There are currently 39 local chapters throughout the United States and Canada.

=== Boston chapter ===
The geographic area of Boston Chapter members consists of Eastern and Central Massachusetts, Maine, New Hampshire, Vermont and Rhode Island. The Boston Chapter of SIM was formed through the efforts of Dick Harris, John Dacey and Edgar Canty. In the fall of 1976 Mr. Harris, who was then ClO at Colonial Gas, was at a meeting in Chicago at which SIM National (then called the Society for the Management of Information Systems - SMIS) was encouraging chapter formation. Harris obtained a listing of SIM members in the Boston area, and called Canty and Dacey to arrange an organizing meeting. The organizing meetings were held at Babson College through the Fall of 1976 and into the Spring of 1977 and, in addition to Harris, Canty and Dacey, involved Don Brown, Les Ball, Stew Stokes,Chris Bullen and Charles Hewitt.

The first Boston SIM meetings began in the fall of 1977 with the meeting locations alternated between Babson College and the MIT Faculty Club. Dick Harris was the first Chapter Chairman, and Jerry Kanter was the first speaker. The Articles of Organization were submitted to the Massachusetts Secretary of State’s office in May 1981, signed by Edgar Canty. The officers were Les Ball, president; Dave Callahan, clerk; and Arthur Sarazini, treasurer. Chapter directors were Bill Synnott, John Dacey, Dick Harris and Dave Callahan. The charter of incorporation was received from national SMIS on June 18, 1981.

Past and Current Presidents of the Boston Chapter

Year	President	Year	President	Year	President	Year	President	Year	President
1977	Dick Harris	1987	Brad Sweet	1997	Kavin Moody	2007	Mary Meadows	2017	James Bowen
1978	Dick Harris	1988	Irwin Abrams	1998	Jim Fitchett	2008	Jo Hoppe	2018	Susan Kifer
1979	John Dacey	1989	Jim Slusser	1999	Bill Wellman	2009	Jo Hoppe	2019	Amanda Moore
1980	Les Ball	1990	Paul Palmisciano	2000	Luke Chilone	2010	Bill Wellman	2020	James Martin
1981	Don Brown	1991	David Briggs	2001	Bill Grady	2011	Kevin More	2021	Jackie Albrecht
1982	Bill Synnott	1992	Rick Swanborg	2002	Bob Barrett	2012	Michael Brooks	2022	Brian Madden
1983	Eeve Arkush	1993	Rick Swanborg	2003	Dave Brown	2013	Tom Catalini	2023	Lori Seuch
1984	Ralph Loftin	1994	Stew Stokes	2004	Pat Randall	2014	Sara Morgan	2024	Matt Nerney
1985	Bart Bolton	1995	Bill Fallon	2005	Pat Randall	2015	Jim Whalen	2025	Sue Bergamo
1986	Warren Harkness	1996	Charles Hewitt	2006	Mike MacKenty	2016	David Jackson	2026	David Vidoni

The Boston Chapter's programs include the MIT Sloan School of Management CIO Symposium, The Leadership Development Roundtable, SIM Silver, Sharpen the Leadership Saw, CIO Roundtables in both the Providence, RI and greater Boston areas, a Practitioner's Roundtable, a Consultants Roundtable, a Help Desk Roundtable and two all-day CIO Summits/Forums. It currently supports the following Outreach programs: Year Up United, The Boston Private Industry Council, Hack Diversity, Resilient Coders, Jr.Tech, and Per Scholas.

=== Portland chapter ===
The Portland Chapter of SIM was initially formed as a satellite of the Seattle SIM Chapter in 1996 through the efforts of Bill Harrison, Norm Alexander, Liz Alexander, Bill Henderson, and Fred Pond. Independent since 1999, the Portland Chapter primarily draws members from the Portland, Oregon, and Vancouver, Washington areas but also has many active members from the Salem and Corvallis regions. As of mid-2020, the chapter boasts more than 170 active members. The region is home to 2.46 million people(2020 Census), over 20 colleges and universities, and two professional sports teams. Besides being known for high-tech manufacturing, Portland is home to the highest number of athletic apparel and outdoor recreation companies in the United States. Locally headquartered firms include Nike and Columbia Sportswear. In addition, the North American headquarters of Adidas, Keen, Danner Boots, SnowPeak, Poler Outdoor Stuff, Wildfang, and Leatherman. International brands such as Nau, Lucy, Dakine, and Under Armour also have a significant presence in Greater Portland.

=== St. Louis chapter ===
The St. Louis Chapter of SIM was formed in 2004 through the efforts of Bob Rouse, Eric Gorham, Judy Winkler, David Kocs, Terry Werner and many RLF graduates. The first meeting was held at Southwestern Bell (now ATT) in May 2004 with Darwin John as the speaker. Geographically, the chapter includes the metropolitan St. Louis region, including surrounding counties in Missouri and Illinois; the region is home to 2.9 million people, 16 colleges and universities, and 9 Fortune 500 companies.

The St. Louis SIM Charter was received at the New York SIMposium in the fall of 2004. Since then many chapter members have served on national SIM boards and committees.

From its beginning, the Chapter concentrated on leadership programs at monthly meetings. In 2006 it established the annual Leadership Workshop, a 2.5-day event featuring CIO leaders and networking opportunities. In 2007 Paul Klover organized the first Charity Golf Tournament; proceeds are donated to area non-profits. The Chapter is also the primary organizer of a large annual technology conference, Gateway to Innovation, which includes biotech, healthcare, government, and information technology. Drawing more than 1,500 participants, high-tech start-ups, vendors and leading speakers, the conference provides a forum for the community to meet and highlight progress and developments. The conference donates 100% of its net proceeds to non-profits in the community, donating more than $3 million in support of technology initiatives, scholarships and education.

=== Central Connecticut chapter ===
The Central Connecticut Chapter of SIM was formed in 1990 by James L. Lamoin with the help of Dick Connel, Bruce Anderson, and Jim Gustafson. The chapter meetings are based in the Hartford, CT area and has had members from all the surrounding companies including Aetna, Travelers, Cigna, Mass Mutual, The Hartford, Chubb, Stanley Black & Decker, United Technologies, Hamilton Standard, Pratt & Whitney, Sikorsky, Hertford Healthcare, Pfizer and many others.

Meetings are held 8 times a year to allow local IT executives to network, learn, and give back to their community. Additionally, the chapter runs a yearly golf tournament that started in 1997 that raises money for scholarships that are issued every year to students pursuing a career in the STEM field. The chapter also runs a large local yearly event to highlight the latest innovations in technology management and leadership.

== See also ==
- Chief Information Officer
- Chief Technology Officer
