= Levelized cost of water =

Measure of efficiency of water treatment

The levelized cost of water (LCOW or LCW) is the "cost per unit volume of product water produced by a water treatment process or service". It is a measure of efficiency, with lower values representing more efficient methods. LCW can refer to drinking water for human consumption or water for irrigation. The LCW varies with the method used to produce drinking water. Desalination, which produces usable water from saline water, has a higher LCW than processing groundwater or surface water. A 2020 study found that advances in decarbonization would reduce the levelized cost of water produced via desalination from €2.4 per cubic meter in 2015 (US$2.84) to €1.05 per cubic meter in 2050 (US$1.24). LCW of desalination also depends on the amount of saline that needs to be removed from water: The United States Department of Energy's 2018 grant guidelines suggested a target of $1.50/m^{3} for solar-thermal desalination of high-salinity water and a target of $0.50/m^{3} for low-salinity water such as sea water.

== See also ==
- Levelized cost of electricity
