= Insurance Services Office =

American company

Insurance Services Office, Inc.
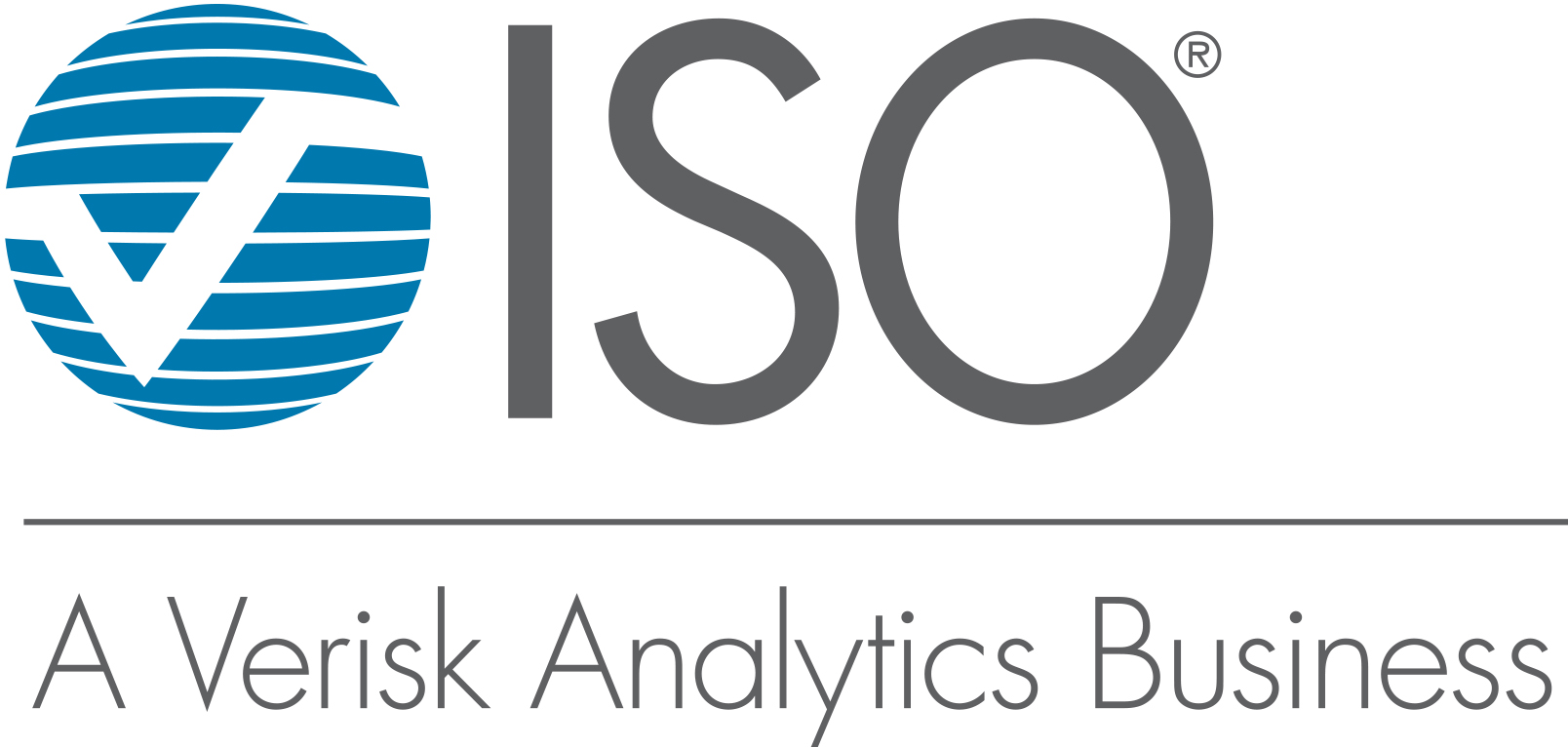

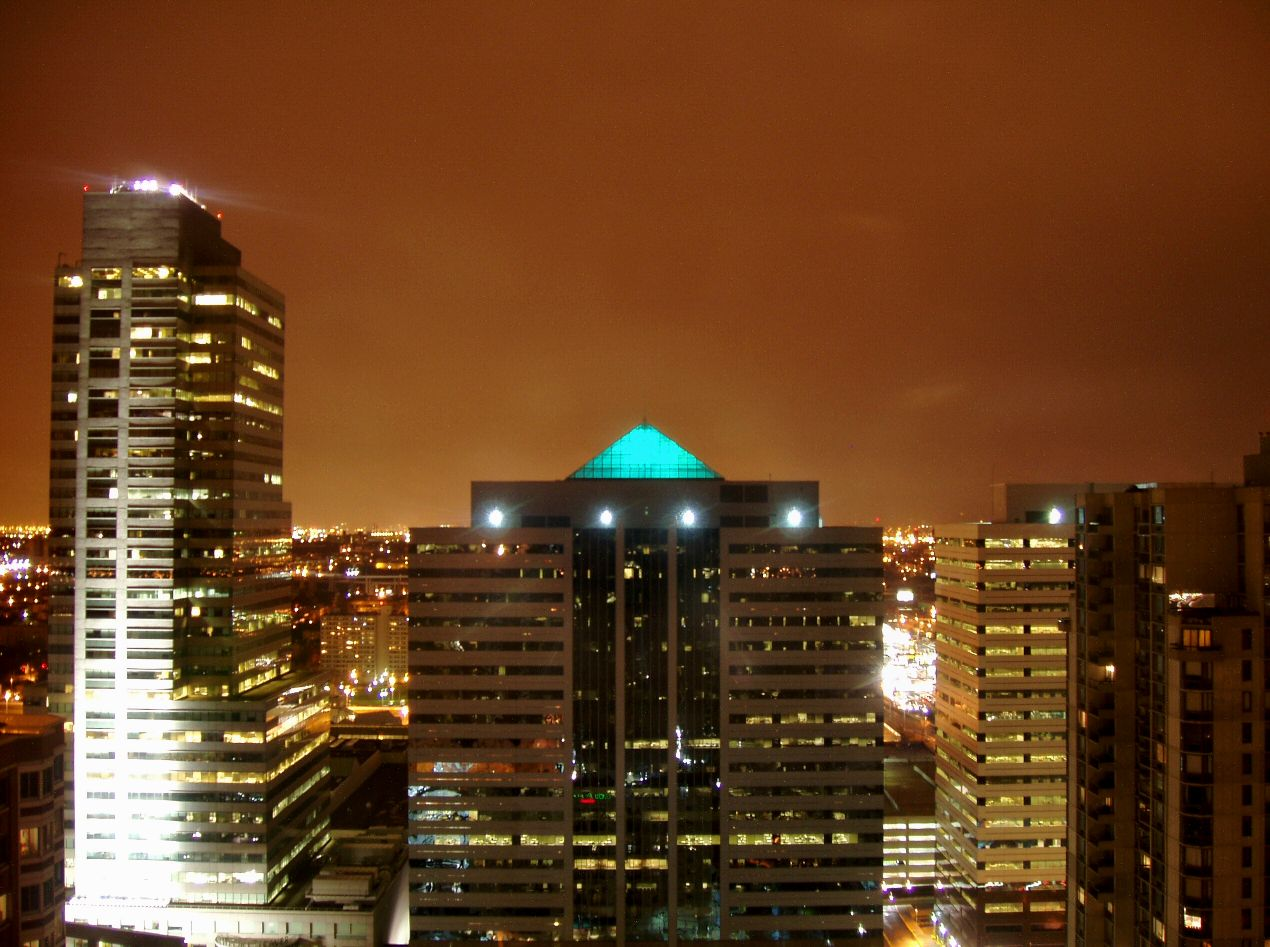
- Verisk corporate headquarters in Jersey City, New Jersey where Verisk's ISO business is located
- Company type: Subsidiary
- Founded: 1971; 55 years ago
- Headquarters: Jersey City, New Jersey, U.S.
- Parent: Verisk Analytics
- Website: verisk.com/insurance/brands/iso/

Insurance Services Office, Inc. (ISO), a subsidiary of Verisk Analytics, is a provider of statistical, actuarial, underwriting, and claims information and analytics; compliance and fraud identification tools; policy language; information about specific locations; and technical services. ISO serves insurers, reinsurers, agents and brokers, insurance regulators, risk managers, and other participants in the property/casualty insurance marketplace. Headquartered in Jersey City, New Jersey, United States, the organization serves clients with offices throughout the United States, along with international operations offices in the United Kingdom, Israel, Germany, India and China.

== Overview ==
ISO was formed in 1971 as an advisory and rating organization for the property/casualty insurance industry to provide statistical and actuarial services, to develop insurance programs, and to assist insurance companies in meeting state regulatory requirements. It became a wholly owned subsidiary of Verisk Analytics in October 2009.

ISO provides a number of risk-related services to its clients:

- Fire and building code information
- Insurance lines services
  - Including standardized text for insurance forms
- Collecting the data
- Insurance products for agents
- Workers' compensation
- Medicare compliance and claims resolution services
- Artificial Intelligence service connector to Anthropic's "Claude" database.

ISO's databases contain more than 19 billion detailed records relating to insurance and risk management, which form the basis for its information services, with two billion records collected each year. ISO employs many members of the Casualty Actuarial Society and other insurance professionals to develop its risk-related products and services.
