= Greentech Media =

American media company

- Type: Online newspaper
- Owner: Wood Mackenzie
- Editor-in-chief: Stephen Lacey
- Founded: 2007
- Ceased publication: 2021
- Language: English
- Headquarters: Boston
- Website: greentechmedia.com

Greentech Media, also known as GTM, was a media company based in Massachusetts, United States, that generated online daily reports, market research studies, and news on green technology and green jobs.

== History ==
Greentech Media was founded in February 2007 by Scott Clavenna and Rick Thompson, and raised $1 million in venture capital funding the following May. In May 2008, it announced it raised another $2.75 million.

In 2016, the research and consultancy group Wood Mackenzie acquired the company.

In February 2021, Wood Mackenzie announced the closure of the company. The company had four offices, in Boston, New York, San Francisco and Munich.

== Podcasts ==
=== Political Climate ===
Political Climate

Production
- Length: 20–70 minutes

Related
- Website: www.politicalclimatepodcast.com

Political Climate was debuted by Greentech Media in April 2018. In 2019, it became funded by the USC Schwarzenegger Institute with support from the Leonardo DiCaprio Foundation, and later from Canary Media and think tank Third Way.

In December 2022, Political Climate announced it was "taking a break" for an indefinite period.

In April 2024, the podcast returned under the production of Latitude Media.

==== Format ====
Political Climate covered recent news items relating to climate activism and politics in the United States of America. It typically featured a debate on energy and environmental policy between its 'resident Republican' Shane Skelton and its 'resident Democrat' Brandon Hurlbut, moderated by journalist Julia Pyper. Since the re-launch of the show in 2024, Emily Domenech has served as the show's 'resident Republican'.

The podcast occasionally featured interviews with politicians, activists, and journalists. Notable guests included United Nations Secretary-General António Guterres, former Governor of California Arnold Schwarzenegger, environmental activist Greta Thunberg, former United States Secretary of State John Kerry, United States Senator Alex Padilla, and former United States Congressman Carlos Curbelo.

==== Awards ====
At the 2022 Cleanie Awards, Political Climate won the People's Choice Award for Top Clean Energy and Sustainability Podcast.

=== Other podcasts ===
Greentech Media produced two other podcasts: Energy Gang, a weekly digest of energy topics, hosted by Stephen Lacey, Katherine Hamilton, and Jigar Shah, and The Interchange, a more technical energy podcast featuring industry insights, hosted by Stephen Lacey and Shayle Kann.

Energy Gang and The Interchange have both continued under the Wood Mackenzie brand.

== Reception and legacy ==
In 2010, the Webby Awards recognised Greentech Media as an Honoree of its 'Websites and Mobile Sites Sustainability & Environment' category.

In 2021, the founder and CEO of CleanTechnica, Scott Cooney, said Greentech Media was "seen as one of the top cleantech sites globally for the last decade plus". Swarnav S Pujari of Gaiascope called it the "go-to publication for cleantech news and analysis".

In April 2021, shortly after Greentech Media closed, several of its journalists and staff members launched Canary Media, an independent affiliate of RMI.
