= Flower (magazine) =

Seasonal english magazine on floral decorations

Flower magazine is a bimonthly, seasonal publication based in Birmingham, Alabama. Founded by Margot Shaw in March 2007, the magazine features national and international content, including profiles of floral designers and their creations, stylish weddings, and inspirations for entertaining and decorating with flowers. Shaw is also the editor of the magazine. At the initial phase the magazine was published quarterly.
