= Fire Underwriters Survey =

Fire Underwriters Survey (FUS) a subsidiary of Opta Information Intelligence Corp., is a provider of data, underwriting, risk management and legal/regulatory services focusing on community fire-protection and fire prevention systems in Canada. Fire Underwriters Survey publishes the Canadian Fire Insurance Grading Index, which is utilized by the property-casualty insurers in that country. Opta Information Intelligence Corp. was acquired by Verisk Analytics Inc. in 2022.

== History ==
The organization was formed in 1883 as the Canadian Fire Underwriters' Association (CFUA), then became the Canadian Underwriters Association (CUA), the Insurers Advisory Organization and Fire Underwriters Survey.

The intent of the system of fire insurance grading is primarily to provide insurers with accurate information to base underwriting decisions on, however a significant benefit of the system is that it results in incentives for development of recognized forms of public fire protection by communities throughout Canada. Many Canadian communities organize and develop their public fire protection systems and organizations to strategically optimize the cost benefit to constituents.
