= Maplecroft =

Risk consultancy firm in Bath, England

Maplecroft is a global risk and strategic consulting firm based in Bath, England. Its work includes analyzing risks affecting global business and investors.

Maplecroft is regularly quoted in the media, particularly on political risk, economics, and the environment.

== Similar companies ==
- ArmorGroup
- Control Risks
- Eurasia Group
- Kroll
- Pinkerton
