= Spyros Makridakis =

American futorologist

Spyros Makridakis (born 22 April 1941) is a professor at the University of Nicosia where he is the Director of the Institute for the Future (IFF) and an Emeritus Professor of Decision Sciences at INSEAD as well as the University of Piraeus and one of the world's leading experts on forecasting, with many journal articles and books on the subject. He is famous as the organizer of the Makridakis Competitions, known in the forecasting literature as the M-Competitions.

== Biography ==
Makridakis was part of the Greek Sailing Team in the 1960 Olympic Games and studied at the Graduate School of Industrial Studies in Piraeus (University of Piraeus, present name). After that, he joined New York University where he obtained a Ph.D. in 1969. He has held a number of teaching and research positions including positions as research fellow at IIM Berlin and Stanford University and a visiting scholar at Harvard and MIT. He joined INSEAD (Fontainebleau, France) in 1970 and is currently a professor at the University of Nicosia in Cyprus and an Emeritus Professor at INSEAD. In addition to teaching and consulting expertise, he has also authored, or co-authored, 24 books including Forecasting, Planning and Strategy for the 21st Century (The Free Press), Forecasting: Methods and Applications, 3rd ed. and Forecasting Methods for Management, 5th ed. (Wiley, translated in twelve languages and sold more than 120,000 copies). He has also published more than 120 articles and book chapters. He was the founding chief editor of the Journal of Forecasting and the International Journal of Forecasting. Furthermore, he has won the "Best Teacher Award" at INSEAD twice.

Makridakis's current interest centers on the uses and limitations of forecasting and what we can do with the resulting uncertainty and risk given our inability to accurately predict a wide range of future events (e.g. the 2000 burst of the Internet bubble or the 2007-2009 major financial crisis). In addition, he is interested in medical decision making by comparing the costs and benefits of treatment. These and similar issues are dealt with in the book Dance with Chance: Making Luck Work for You (co-authored with Robin Hogarth and Anil Gaba) and in a special issue of the International Journal of Forecasting on "Decision Making and Planning Under Low Levels of Predictability" (co-edited with Nassim Taleb).

== Contributions to forecasting ==
=== Empirical testing of forecasting accuracy through competitions and time series compilation ===
A 1979 paper by Makridakis and Hibon compared 111 time series from a variety of different sources in order to determine the relative accuracy of different forecasting methods, and came to the conclusion that simple methods, such as exponential smoothing, outperformed complicated ones. This was followed with publication of results from three Makridakis Competitions: the M-competition in 1982, the M-2 competition in 1993, and the M-3 competition in 2000.

=== Service to the forecasting community ===
Apart from organizing the Makridakis Competitions, Makridakis was one of the founders and the first editor-in-chief of the Journal of Forecasting and the International Journal of Forecasting, a publication of the International Institute of Forecasters (he was editor-in-chief from 1982 to 1987).

=== Books and popular articles ===
Professor Makridakis has authored, or co-authored, twenty-seven books and more than 360 articles. His book Forecasting Methods for Management, 5th ed. (Wiley) has been translated in twelve languages and sold more than 120,000 copies while his book Forecasting: Methods and Applications, 3rd ed. (Wiley) has been a widely used textbook in the forecasting field with more than 5,300 citations. Professor Makridakis was the founding editor-in-chief of the Journal of Forecasting and the International Journal of Forecasting and is the organizer of the M (Makridakis) Competitions. His article "Statistical and Machine Learning Forecasting Methods: Concerns and ways forwards" has been viewed/downloaded more than 123,000 times in PLOS ONE where it was published in March 2018 while his paper "The forthcoming Artificial Intelligence (AI) revolution: Its impact on society and firms" (Futures, March 2017) is the most downloaded one of the journal:

- Dance with Chance with Robin Hogarth and Anil Gaba (2010): The book is aimed at a general audience. The authors also appeared in a video along with Nassim Nicholas Taleb to discuss the implications of the themes of the book.
- Forecasting: Methods and Applications (3rd Edition) with Steven C. Wheelwright and Rob J. Hyndman (1983)
- Forecasting, Planning and Strategies for the 21st Century (1990) and
- Forecasting Methods for Management with Steve Wheelright (1990) that has been translated in twelve languages and has sold more than 120,000 copies.

Makridakis, Hogarth, and Gaba (authors of the Dance with Chance book) also co-authored an article for the Winter 2010 issue of MIT Sloan Management Review.

== See also ==
- J. Scott Armstrong
- International Institute of Forecasters
- International Journal of Forecasting
