= List of The New York Times number-one books of 1987 =

The American daily newspaper The New York Times publishes multiple weekly lists ranking the best-selling books in the United States.

== Fiction ==
The following list ranks the number-one best-selling fiction books, in the hardcover fiction category.

Date	Book	Author
January 4	It	Stephen King
January 11	It	Stephen King
January 18	Red Storm Rising	Tom Clancy
January 25	Red Storm Rising	Tom Clancy
February 1	The Eyes of the Dragon	Stephen King
February 8	Windmills of the Gods	Sidney Sheldon
February 15	Windmills of the Gods	Sidney Sheldon
February 22	Windmills of the Gods	Sidney Sheldon
March 1	Windmills of the Gods	Sidney Sheldon
March 8	Windmills of the Gods	Sidney Sheldon
March 15	Windmills of the Gods	Sidney Sheldon
March 22	Windmills of the Gods	Sidney Sheldon
March 29	Fine Things	Danielle Steel
April 5	Fine Things	Danielle Steel
April 12	Fine Things	Danielle Steel
April 19	Fine Things	Danielle Steel
April 26	Fine Things	Danielle Steel
May 3	Fine Things	Danielle Steel
May 10	Fine Things	Danielle Steel
May 17	Fine Things	Danielle Steel
May 24	Fine Things	Danielle Steel
May 31	The Haunted Mesa	Louis L'Amour
June 7	Misery	Stephen King
June 14	Misery	Stephen King
June 21	Misery	Stephen King
June 28	Misery	Stephen King
July 5	Misery	Stephen King
July 12	Misery	Stephen King
July 19	Misery	Stephen King
July 26	Presumed Innocent	Scott Turow
August 2	Patriot Games	Tom Clancy
August 9	Patriot Games	Tom Clancy
August 16	Patriot Games	Tom Clancy
August 23	Patriot Games	Tom Clancy
August 30	Patriot Games	Tom Clancy
September 6	Presumed Innocent	Scott Turow
September 13	Presumed Innocent	Scott Turow
September 20	Presumed Innocent	Scott Turow
September 27	Presumed Innocent	Scott Turow
October 4	Presumed Innocent	Scott Turow
October 11	Presumed Innocent	Scott Turow
October 18	Presumed Innocent	Scott Turow
October 25	Kaleidoscope	Danielle Steel
November 1	Kaleidoscope	Danielle Steel
November 8	Kaleidoscope	Danielle Steel
November 15	Kaleidoscope	Danielle Steel
November 22	Kaleidoscope	Danielle Steel
November 29	The Tommyknockers	Stephen King
December 6	The Tommyknockers	Stephen King
December 13	The Tommyknockers	Stephen King
December 20	The Tommyknockers	Stephen King
December 27	The Tommyknockers	Stephen King

== Nonfiction ==
The following list ranks the number-one best-selling nonfiction books, in the hardcover nonfiction category.

Date	Book	Author
January 4	Fatherhood	Bill Cosby
January 11	Fatherhood	Bill Cosby
January 18	Fatherhood	Bill Cosby
January 25	Fatherhood	Bill Cosby
February 1	A Season on the Brink	John Feinstein
February 8	A Season on the Brink	John Feinstein
February 15	A Season on the Brink	John Feinstein
February 22	A Season on the Brink	John Feinstein
March 1	A Season on the Brink	John Feinstein
March 8	A Season on the Brink	John Feinstein
March 15	A Season on the Brink	John Feinstein
March 22	A Season on the Brink	John Feinstein
March 29	A Season on the Brink	John Feinstein
April 5	A Season on the Brink	John Feinstein
April 12	A Season on the Brink	John Feinstein
April 19	A Season on the Brink	John Feinstein
April 26	A Season on the Brink	John Feinstein
May 3	A Season on the Brink	John Feinstein
May 10	Communion	Whitley Strieber
May 17	Love, Medicine & Miracles	Bernie S. Siegel
May 24	Communion	Whitley Strieber
May 31	Communion	Whitley Strieber
June 7	The Closing of the American Mind	Allan Bloom
June 14	The Closing of the American Mind	Allan Bloom
June 21	The Closing of the American Mind	Allan Bloom
June 28	The Closing of the American Mind	Allan Bloom
July 5	The Closing of the American Mind	Allan Bloom
July 12	The Closing of the American Mind	Allan Bloom
July 19	The Closing of the American Mind	Allan Bloom
July 26	The Closing of the American Mind	Allan Bloom
August 2	The Closing of the American Mind	Allan Bloom
August 9	The Closing of the American Mind	Allan Bloom
August 16	Spycatcher	Peter Wright
August 23	Spycatcher	Peter Wright
August 30	Spycatcher	Peter Wright
September 6	Spycatcher	Peter Wright
September 13	Spycatcher	Peter Wright
September 20	Spycatcher	Peter Wright
September 27	Spycatcher	Peter Wright
October 4	Spycatcher	Peter Wright
October 11	Spycatcher	Peter Wright
October 18	Veil	Bob Woodward
October 25	Veil	Bob Woodward
November 1	Veil	Bob Woodward
November 8	Veil	Bob Woodward
November 15	The Great Depression of 1990	Ravi Batra
November 22	The Great Depression of 1990	Ravi Batra
November 29	Free to Be... a Family	edited by Marlo Thomas with Christopher Cerf and Letty Cottin Pogrebin
December 6	Time Flies	Bill Cosby
December 13	Time Flies	Bill Cosby
December 20	Time Flies	Bill Cosby
December 27	Time Flies	Bill Cosby

== See also ==
- Publishers Weekly list of bestselling novels in the United States in the 1980s
