= Journal of Business Forecasting =

- Discipline: Forecasting
- Language: English
- Edited by: Dr. Chaman Jain

Publication details
- History: 1982-present
- Publisher: Institute of Business Forecasting & Planning
- Frequency: Quarterly

Standard abbreviations
- ISO 4: J. Bus. Forecast.

Indexing
- ISSN: 1930-126X
- LCCN: 2005265513
- OCLC no.: 862083408

Links
- Journal homepage

The Journal of Business Forecasting is a quarterly peer-reviewed academic journal covering business forecasting that is published by the Institute of Business Forecasting & Planning. It was established in 1982.

== See also ==
- Journal of Forecasting
- International Journal of Forecasting
- Foresight: The International Journal of Applied Forecasting
