= JBF =

JBF may refer to:

- James Beard Foundation, an American culinary professional association
  - James Beard Foundation Award
- Japan Bandy Federation
- Jordan Basketball Federation, who control the Jordan national basketball team
- Jordan Billiard Federation, a member of the Asian Carom Billiard Confederation
- Journal of Business Forecasting
- Joyce Banda Foundation, a school in Malawi
