= Bio-index model =

The Bio-index model is a forecasting model for predicting the outcome of United States presidential elections based on biographical information about candidates. The model, developed by J. Scott Armstrong and Andreas Graefe and first published in the Journal of Business Research, uses 59 biographical cues that are expected to affect the chances of a candidate on being elected.

== Background ==
There is a large stream of research in the field of psychology that analyzes questions such as "what makes people emerge as leaders?" For example, meta-analyses found intelligence and height to benefit both leader performance and leader emergence. Such findings from prior research were used to identify and code the majority of variables in the bio-index. In addition, for some variables, the authors used common sense. For example, it was assumed that a candidates are more attractive to voters if they are married but not divorced.

In general, the model distinguishes two types of variables:

1. Yes / No variables (n=48): For this type of variable, candidates are assigned a score of 1 if they possess a certain attribute and 0 otherwise. For example, a candidate receives positive scores if he descends from a political family, is first-born, single child, lost a parent in childhood, is married but not divorced, has children, graduated from a prestigious college, held political offices, has authored a book, or has military experience.
2. Comparative variables (n=11): For this type of variable, the candidates of the two major parties are compared on the underlying attribute. The candidate who scores better than his opponent is assigned a score of 1 and 0 otherwise. For example, candidates who are taller, heavier, better-looking, more intelligent or have the more common name than their opponent receive a positive score while their opponent received a score of 0 for these variables.

After all variables have been coded, the total index scores for each candidate are calculated. Then, the candidate who achieves the higher overall score is predicted as the election winner.

== Decision-making implications ==
In using biographical information about candidates for generating the forecast, the model can be useful to political decision-makers. The bio-index model advises the challenging party (i.e., the Republican Party) to nominate the candidate with the highest index score relative to the index score of the incumbent president (i.e., Barack Obama). In particular, the model can advise decisions such as whether a candidate should run for office or which candidate a party should nominate.

== Past performance ==
Armstrong and Graefe tested their model for the 29 U.S. presidential elections from 1896 to 2008. The model failed only two times. For the remaining 27 elections, the model correctly predicted the winner. The model wrongly predicted Ford to beat Carter in 1976 as well as Bush to defeat Clinton in 1992. This record of 93% correct predictions compared favorably to other statistical models as well as to polls and prediction markets.

== 2012 forecasts ==
With the bio-index, forecasts of the election outcome can be made as soon as the candidates are known; they can be issued even before, conditionally, on who is expected to be in the race. Thus, the model was used to help the Republican Party to decide whom they should nominate to run against President Obama in 2012.

Forecasts of the chances of major Republican candidates to defeat Obama in 2012 were published in a research paper that was presented at the 2011 International Symposium on Forecasting and the 2011 Annual Meeting of the American Political Science Association.

According to the bio-index model, of all Republican candidates in the field, Rick Perry had the highest chance to defeat Obama in 2012.
