= M3 Competition =

M3 Competition may refer to:

- Makridakis Competitions
- BMW M3 Competition
