= J. Scott Armstrong =

American marketing expert (1937–2023)

- Born: John Scott Armstrong; March 26, 1937
- Died: September 28, 2023 (aged 86)
- Education: MIT Sloan School of Management; Carnegie Mellon; Lehigh University
- Scientific career
- Fields: Marketing, advertising
- Workplaces: The Wharton School, University of Pennsylvania

John Scott Armstrong (March 26, 1937 – September 28, 2023) was an author, forecasting and marketing expert, and an Emeritus Professor of Marketing at the Wharton School of the University of Pennsylvania. Armstrong's research and writing in forecasting promote the ideas that in order to maximize accuracy, forecasting methods should rely on evidence-based methods.

== Education and background ==
Armstrong received his B.A. in applied science (1959) and his B.S. in industrial engineering (1960) from Lehigh University. In 1965, he received his M.S. in industrial administration from Carnegie-Mellon University. He received his Ph.D. in management from the MIT Sloan School of Management in 1968. He has taught in Thailand, Switzerland, Sweden, New Zealand, Australia, South Africa, Argentina, Japan, and other countries.

== Forecasting ==
Armstrong is the author of Long-Range Forecasting and the editor and co-author of Principles of Forecasting: A Handbook for Researchers and Practitioners. He was a founder and editor of the Journal of Forecasting, and a founder of the International Journal of Forecasting, and the International Symposium on Forecasting.

Armstrong's work in forecasting promotes the ideas that in order to maximize accuracy, forecasting methods should be conservative (i.e., be consistent with cumulative knowledge of the past), and rely on simple evidence-based methods.

== Marketing and advertising ==
Armstrong's book Persuasive Advertising: Evidence-based Principles was published by Palgrave Macmillan in 2010. In it, Armstrong presents 194 principles designed to increase the persuasiveness of advertisements. The principles were derived from empirical data, expert opinion, and observation. They are organized and indexed under ten general principles (e.g. emotion, attention), and those ten principles are further grouped into three categories: strategy, general tactics, and media-specific tactics.

In 1989, a University of Maryland study ranked Armstrong among the top 15 marketing professors in the U.S. based on a study using peer ratings, citations, and publications. He serves or has served on editorial positions for the Journal of the Academy of Marketing Science, the Journal of Business Research, Interfaces, and other journals. He was awarded the Society for Marketing Advances Distinguished Scholar Award for 2000.

== Public policy ==
Armstrong also has published several papers dealing with public policy issues: ranging from the effectiveness of government mandated disclaimers, to the moral hazards of executive compensation. Regarding government mandated disclaimers, Armstrong argues that they can be ineffective- or even harmful- by encouraging negative behavior, perhaps by reducing the buyer's sense of personal responsibility. Armstrong further asserts that the free market will ensure that the appropriate information about a given product is made public. Sellers will label their products appropriately, as they have a long-term interest to ensure the satisfaction of buyers. Buyers themselves will seek to find out information about the product, as it is not directly provided to them. Regarding executive compensation, Armstrong published research in 2013 arguing that high executive pay fails to promote better performance. Additionally, the research argues that high pay incentivizes unethical behavior for executives, as they have little motivation to promote a firm's interest long-term.

Additionally, Armstrong has extensively researched the usage of the scientific method in modern academia; his research concluded that the majority of papers published do not comply with basic scientific guidelines. As a result of these findings, he co-created an evidence-based checklist of scientific principles that can be used to evaluate the scientific merit of a given paper.

== Climate change ==
In an article published in Energy & Environment, Armstrong posited that the climate scientists have ignored the "scientific literature on forecasting principles", for instance by not referring to his own website forecastingprinciples.com. Armstrong wrote that of 17 articles by climatologists, none referred to "the scientific literature on forecasting methods". A group of biologists, whose polar bear research Armstrong disagreed with on that basis, have called Armstrong's applications of business forecasting methods to scientific projections "too ambiguous and subjective to be used as a reliable basis for auditing scientific investigations." Climatologist Kevin Trenberth states that Armstrong's criticisms "overlooked the fact that [the IPCC reports] address many of the things he is critical of."

Armstrong extended a "Global Warming Challenge" to Al Gore in June 2007, in the style of the Simon–Ehrlich wager. Each side was to place $10,000 ($20,000 total) in trust, with the winner being determined by annual mean temperatures. Gore declined the wager, stating that he does not gamble. Climatologist Gavin Schmidt described Armstrong's wager as "essentially a bet on year to year weather noise" rather than climate change.

Armstrong has published articles and testified before Congress on forecasts of polar bear populations, arguing that previous estimates were too flawed to justify listing the bear as an endangered species. In an evaluation of Armstrong and other authors’ criticism of polar bear population forecasts, Amstrup and other authors concluded that all of the claims made by Armstrong were either mistaken or misleading. Armstrong also served as a Policy Expert consultant to the Heartland Institute, a conservative and libertarian public policy think tank.

== Selected publications ==
=== Books ===
- The Scientific Method
- Persuasive Advertising: Evidence-based Principles
- Long-Range Forecasting
- Principles of Forecasting: A Handbook for Researchers and Practitioners

=== Papers ===
- Collopy, Fred; Armstrong, J. Scott (1992). "Rule-Based Forecasting: Development and Validation of an Expert Systems Approach to Combining Time Series Extrapolations". Management Science. 38 (10): 1394–1414. doi:10.1287/mnsc.38.10.1394. S2CID 5968619. Archived from the original on April 4, 2010.
- Armstrong, J. Scott; Collopy, Fred (1992). "Error Measures for Generalizing about Forecasting Methods: Empirical Comparisons". International Journal of Forecasting. 8: 69–80. doi:10.1016/0169-2070(92)90008-W. S2CID 11034360. Archived from the original on July 25, 2010.
- Armstrong, J. Scott (2012). "Natural Learning in Higher Education". Encyclopedia of the Sciences of Learning. Springer. pp. 2426–2433.
- Jacquart, Philippe; Armstrong, J. Scott (2013). "Are top executives paid enough? An evidence-based review" (PDF). Interfaces. 43 (6): 580–586. doi:10.1287/inte.2013.0705. Archived from the original (PDF) on 2017-08-08.
- Armstrong, J. Scott; Du, Rui; Green, Kesten C.; Graefe, Andreas (2016). "Predictive validity of evidence-based persuasion principles: An application of the index method". European Journal of Marketing: 50. doi:10.1108/EJM-10-2015-0728. hdl:11541.2/119071.
- Armstrong, J. Scott; Green, Kesten C. (2013). "Effects of corporate social responsibility and irresponsibility policies" (PDF). Journal of Business Research. 66 (10): 1922–1927. doi:10.1016/j.jbusres.2013.02.014. S2CID 145059055.
- Armstrong, J. Scott; Green, Kesten C. (2017). Guidelines for Science: Evidence and Checklists (Report).

== Founder ==
Armstrong is a founder or co-founder of these organizations, journals, and websites:

=== Organizations ===
- International Institute of Forecasters, established 1982.
- International Symposium on Forecasting, annually since 1981.

=== Journals ===
- Journal of Forecasting, founded 1982. 1982-83 citation impact factor 7th in business, management, and planning journals.
- International Journal of Forecasting, established 1985.

=== Websites ===
- ForecastingPrinciples.com, founded 1997.
- AdPrin.com, founded 2000. 2004 MERLOT Award, “Best online learning resource business & management.”
- PollyVote.com, founded 2004.
- TheClimateBet.com, 2007 challenge to Al Gore.
- IronLawofRegulation.com, founded 2016.

== Awards and honors ==
- Received Lifetime Achievement Award in Climate Science from the Heartland Institute (2017)
- Selected as the inaugural lecturer for the “Armstrong Brilliance in Research in Marketing Award” (Hong Kong 2016)
- SMA/JAI Press Distinguished Scholar Award for 2000, 2000
- Silver Jubilee Lecturer for the 25th Anniversary Celebration of the College of Business at Massey University in New Zealand, 1998
- Honorary Fellow for “Distinguished Contributions to Forecasting” by the International Institute of Forecasters (1996)
- Ranked 15th among U. S. marketing professors based on peer ratings, citations, and publications (Kirkpatrick & Locke 1989)

== See also ==
- Bio-index model
