= Foresight (forecasting journal) =

- Discipline: Forecasting
- Language: English
- Edited by: Len Tashman

Publication details
- History: 2005–present
- Publisher: International Institute of Forecasters

Standard abbreviations
- ISO 4: Foresight (Colch.)

Indexing
- ISSN: 1555-9068
- LCCN: 2005213915
- OCLC no.: 60195048

Links
- Journal homepage

Foresight: The International Journal of Applied Forecasting is a forecasting journal published quarterly by the International Institute of Forecasters. Foresight was launched in 2005 as a practitioner-focused companion to the IIF's International Journal of Forecasting.

Foresight publishes peer-reviewed articles written by academics and business forecasters on topics including design and management of forecasting processes, forecasting models, integrating forecasting into business planning, sales forecasting, prediction markets, reviews of forecasting tools and books, sales and operations planning (S&OP), improving forecasting accuracy, and demand forecasting.

All Foresight back issues and articles are indexed via the IDEAS Database.
