= Pierre Pinson =

French mathematician (born 1980)

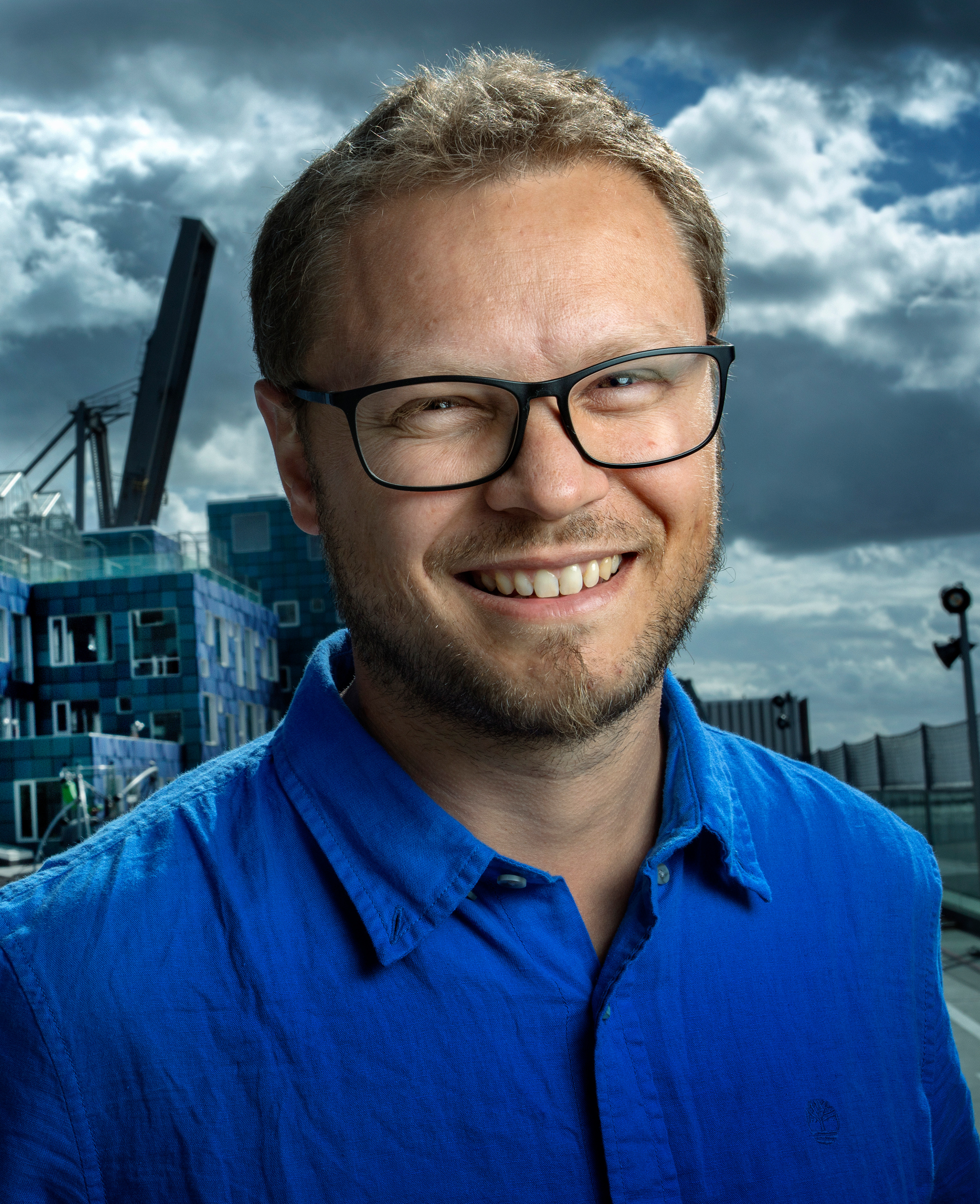
- Born: 28 March 1980 (age 46); Poitiers
- Education: Ecole des Mines de Paris; Institut National des Sciences Appliquées
- Known for: Forecasting, Energy Market Design
- Awards: IDA Elektropris 2018
- Scientific career
- Fields: Applied Mathematics, Management Science, Energy Engineering
- Workplaces: Technical University of Denmark
- Thesis: Estimation of Uncertainty in Wind Power Forecasting (2006)
- Doctoral advisor: George Kariniotakis
- Website: pierrepinson.com

Pierre Pinson (born 28 March 1980) is a French applied mathematician known for his work on forecasting, optimisation and management science for energy systems, e.g., including probabilistic forecasting, participation of renewable energy generation in electricity markets, market-based coordination of energy systems, peer-to-peer energy markets, as well as data markets. He is a professor at the Technical University of Denmark and has been Editor-in-Chief of the International Journal of Forecasting from 2019 onwards.

Pierre Pinson grew up near Poitiers, France and moved to Toulouse at the age of 17. He studied applied mathematics at the Institut National des Sciences Appliquées, graduating with an MSc in applied mathematics in 2002. He then moved to Sophia Antipolis, France to complete a PhD with the Ecole des Mines de Paris in 2006, with a doctoral dissertation, "Pinson P. Estimation of the uncertainty in wind power forecasting" (Doctoral dissertation, École Nationale Supérieure des Mines de Paris).

That year, he moved to Denmark to start with the Technical University of Denmark. After a period with the Department of Applied Mathematics and Computer Sciences, he was a professor with the Department of Electrical Engineering between 2013 and 2020. Since 2021, is a Professor of Operations Research with the Department of Technology, Management and Economics at the same university.

Previously, he was a visiting researcher at the University of Oxford Mathematical Institute and the University of Washington, a scientist at the European Centre for Medium-range Weather Forecasts (ECMWF, UK), a visiting professor at Ecole Normale Supérieure (Rennes, France), as well as a Simons Fellow at the Isaac Newton Institute for Mathematical Sciences (Cambridge, UK).

== Most cited publications ==
- Pinson P, Chevallier C, Kariniotakis GN. Trading wind generation from short-term probabilistic forecasts of wind power. IEEE Transactions on Power Systems. 2007 Jul 30;22(3):1148-56. According to Google Scholar it has been cited 631 times.
- Wan C, Xu Z, Pinson P, Dong ZY, Wong KP. Probabilistic forecasting of wind power generation using extreme learning machine.IEEE Transactions on Power Systems'. 2013 Nov 14;29(3):1033-44. According to Google Scholar, this article has been cited 521 times
- Pinson P, Madsen H, Nielsen HA, Papaefthymiou G, Klöckl B. From probabilistic forecasts to statistical scenarios of short‐term wind power production. Wind Energy: An International Journal for Progress and Applications in Wind Power Conversion Technology. 2009 Jan;12(1):51-62. According to Google Scholar, this article has been cited 490 times
- He G, Chen Q, Kang C, Pinson P, Xia Q. Optimal bidding strategy of battery storage in power markets considering performance-based regulation and battery cycle life. IEEE Transactions on Smart Grid. 2015 May 13;7(5):2359-67. According to Google Scholar, this article has been cited 284 times
