= The Downfall of Capitalism and Communism =

1978 book by Ravi Batra

- Second edition (1990)
- Author: Ravi Batra
- Original title: The Downfall of Capitalism and Communism; A New Study of History
- Language: English
- Subject: Socio-political evolution
- Published: May 1978 Venus Books (1st Ed.); January 1990 Macmillan Publishers (2nd Ed.)
- Publication place: United States
- Media type: Print (Hardback)
- Pages: 350 (1990)
- ISBN: 0-333-21645-8 (1st Ed.); 0-939352-09-5 (2nd Ed.)

The Downfall of Capitalism and Communism is a book by Ravi Batra in the field of historical evolution, first published in 1978. The book's original subtitle is A New Study of History. Following the collapse of Soviet Communism, a second edition was published in 1990 with the subtitle Can Capitalism Be Saved?

The book introduced an application of P.R. Sarkar's idea that different socio-political groups, based on "inherent differences in human nature", that in turn are rooted in "characteristics of the mind," rotate in controlling the social motivity, determine the historical evolution over time. Batra argues that groups of warriors, intellectuals or acquisitors take turns at leading society in their respective ages marked by ascension, supremacy and decline; citing historical examples.

The dissolution of the Soviet Union and the fall of the Iron Curtain occurred just over one decade after the book was published; but the regime was not replaced in the way Batra predicted.

== Predictions ==
Batra predicted that both capitalism and communism would collapse around the year 2000. The Prime Minister of Italy awarded Batra the Medal of the Italian Senate for this prediction in 1990.

=== Downfall of capitalism ===
Batra suggested capitalism would collapse before communism.

That capitalism is eventually doomed to extinction, even its most ardent supporters would admit. Many would argue that by gradual evolution itself the facial features of capitalism will be altered, if not transformed. However, I believe the [social] revolution will occur in the next twenty-five to fifty years. (pg. 238)

In 1985, in The Great Depression of 1990, Batra predicted the collapse of capitalism would begin in 1990. In 2007, Batra made new predictions in his book The New Golden Age: The Coming Revolution against Political Corruption and Economic Chaos which he subsequently felt were being realised with Occupy Wall Street.

== See also ==
- Predictions of the collapse of the Soviet Union
- Progressive Utilization Theory
