= The Great Depression of 1990 =

Book about how to stop a predicted financial crisis

- Simon & Schuster edition
- Author: Ravi Batra
- Original title: Regular Cycles of Money, Inflation, Regulation and Depressions
- Language: English
- Subject: Economic history and future evolution
- Published: January 1985 Venus Books; May 1988 Simon & Schuster
- Publication place: United States
- Media type: Print (Hardback)
- ISBN: 0-440-20168-3 (2nd Ed.)
- LC Class: HC106.8 .B39 1985
- Followed by: Surviving the Great Depression of 1990

The Great Depression of 1990 is a book by Ravi Batra in the field of economic history and future evolution, originally published in 1985. The book's original title was Regular Cycles of Money, Inflation, Regulation and Depressions. MIT Economics Professor Lester Thurow wrote a favorable introduction for the book with its original title. Retitled, the book entered the New York Times Best Seller list in early 1987 and reached No. 1 later that year. The book and its sequel, Surviving the Great Depression of 1990, made Batra "one of the best selling economists of all time".

The book was frequently criticized by economists after it became a best-seller, as it focused on a darker side of capitalistic development, notably Batra's main claim that excessive inequality in capitalist societies can lead to financial crises and economic depressions. Importantly, the prediction in the title did not materialize.

== Reception ==
In late 1987, Milton Friedman was asked by the San Francisco Chronicle about Batra's new best-seller. Friedman replied that he would "not touch it with a ten foot pole".

In a review in the Los Angeles Times, economist Paul Erdman, considered the book to be "a strange mixture of voodoo historical theories and sound economic analysis. It provokes, and we can use the provocation."

Marketing professor J. Scott Armstrong was far more critical. Writing in the International Journal of Forecasting, Armstrong noted problems in three areas. First, Batra made an argument from authority based in part on his prolific publication record, but his work was much less cited than would be expected by someone claiming to be a "superstar" as Batra did. Second, Batra based his ideas on business cycles from a sample size of six and did not buttress his conclusions or methodology with citations to the relevant literature. Third, the reliance on Sarkar's philosophy led to imprecise terminology that prevented a coherent theory. Armstrong concluded that while some recommendations of the book were sensible, others were "potentially dangerous" and the conclusions drawn by the author were not supported by the text.

New York Times reporter Thomas C. Hayes noted Batra's "penchant for sweeping generalizations, factual errors and other missteps" and that despite impressive sales, "many academic and business economists have ignored the book".

The book was generally ignored after its key prediction failed to materialize in the 1990s.
