= Robin Hogarth =

- Born: 1948 (age 77–78)
- Occupation: Record producer
- Known for: Producing Grammy Award-winning albums for Soweto Gospel Choir
- Website: Robin Hogarth's Official site

Robin Hogarth (born 1948) is the British record producer of two Soweto Gospel Choir Grammy Award-winning albums: Blessed in 2006 and African Spirit in 2008.
