= International Institute of Forecasters =

The International Institute of Forecasters (IIF) is a non-profit organization focused on improving forecasting research and practice.

The IIF was founded in 1981 and is based in Medford, Massachusetts.

== Publications ==
The IIF publishes the following:

- Foresight: The International Journal of Applied Forecasting
- International Journal of Forecasting, published in collaboration with Elsevier
- The Oracle
- Forecasting Impact, Podcast

== Conferences ==
The IIF organizes the annual International Symposium on Forecasting, held in a different location each year. For the past 40 years, this event has been recognized for the important forecasting research presented there, and for hosting highly respected experts in the field of forecasting, including many Nobel laureates.

The IIF has also organized workshops and sponsored other conferences, such as the Foresight Practitioner Conference.

The IIF has collaborated with other organizations, such as Lancaster University, SAP Switzerland AG, and Amazon, to provide workshops for the conferences.

== Other activities ==
The IIF sponsors the M Competitions, a contest to learn how to improve forecasting accuracy and advance the theory and practice of forecasting.

The IIF also teamed up with the SAS Institute to award two $5000 research grants in 2011. Currently, the IIF is collaborating with SAS to offer financial support for research on improving forecasting methods and business forecasting practice. Two $10,000 grants are awarded annually.

Additionally, The IIF Board of Directors honors distinguished forecasters with the title of IIF Fellow, based on their contributions to the field of forecasting, the International Journal of Forecasting and the Institute.

== History ==
1979 The IIF was founded and the Journal of Forecasting began publication.

1981 The first International Symposium on Forecasting (ISF) was held in Quebec.

1982 The IIF started offering membership.

1983 The ISF took place in Philadelphia, with Scott Armstrong as General Chair. Through mass advertising and promotion, including WSJ, Economist, an interview on Voice of America, and a direct mail piece sent to 300,000 people, the attendance was the highest in ISF history, with approximately 1,000 attendees.

1985 The International Journal of Forecasting began publication.

2005 The first practitioner journal, Foresight: The International Journal of Applied Forecasting, is created.

2020/2021 ISFs are held virtually for the first time.
