= Ravi Batra =

Indian-American economist, author, and professor

- Born: Raveendra Nath Batra; June 27, 1943; Multan, Punjab, British India
- Died: August 5, 2026 (aged 83)

Academic background
- Education: Southern Illinois University (Ph.D.); Delhi School of Economics (M.A.) Delhi University (B.A) Punjab University
- Influences: P.R. Sarkar

Academic work
- Discipline: International economics, macroeconomics
- School or tradition: Progressive Utilization school
- Institutions: Southern Methodist University
- Notable ideas: International Trade Theory; Macroeconomic theory Labour economics Development theory
- Awards: Ig Nobel prize, 1993

Raveendra Nath "Ravi" Batra (June 27, 1943 – August 5, 2026) was an Indian-American economist, author, and professor at Southern Methodist University. Batra was the author of six bestselling books, two of which appeared on The New York Times Best Seller list, with one (The Great Depression of 1990) reaching No. 1 in late 1987. His books center on his idea that financial capitalism breeds excessive inequality and political corruption, which inevitably succumbs to financial crisis and economic depression.

In his works, Batra proposes an equitable distribution system known as Progressive Utilization Theory (PROUT) as a means to not only ensure material welfare but also to secure the ability of all to develop a full personality. Batra has appeared on CBS, NBC, CNN, ABC, and CNBC, and has been profiled in The New York Times, Time, and Newsweek. Since the 2008 financial crisis, Batra has been a frequent guest on radio shows and featured in numerous publications.

== Academic career ==
Batra obtained his B.A. degree from Punjab University in 1963 and M.A. degree from Delhi School of Economics in 1965. In 1969 he received his Ph.D. in economics from Southern Illinois University. He became assistant professor of economics at the University of Western Ontario in 1969. He moved to Southern Methodist University in Dallas, Texas, in 1970 to become assistant professor of economics. In 1972, he became associate professor, and in 1973 he was appointed full professor of economics and head of department at the age of 30. Prior to 1978 he published advanced theoretical articles and two books, primarily in the field of trade theory.

== Spiritual heritage ==
Batra's writings should be considered in terms of the philosophy of his mentor, Prabhat Ranjan Sarkar, who has had a profound influence on him.

== Novel ideas ==
In 1963, Batra met his mentor, P.R. Sarkar (1921–1990), and after establishing himself in his chosen field, he decided to branch out by contributing to his mentor's work. In 1978, he published a novel book The Downfall of Capitalism and Communism: A New Study of History, where he turned his gaze from theoretical economics to history. In the book Batra promoted the Social cycle theory of his spiritual mentor, Sarkar, based on an analysis of four distinct classes with different psychological preferences or endowments. At the same time, Batra has theorised that economic inequality affects economic performance and social change. He popularised the concept of the "share of wealth held by richest 1%", as an indicator of inequality and an important determinant of depressions.

=== Social evolution ===
The main thesis of the book was that the age of acquisitors, better known as capitalism, was soon to come to an end in the West. This dramatic change was to be followed by the downfall of the age of commanders in the Soviet Union, more commonly known as communism. While his predictions for capitalism to collapse within a few decades due to rampant inequality and speculation have not come true, his prediction for the collapse of communism, due to inner stasis and oppression, arrived in 1990, sooner than expected. The key reason that capitalism, as a self-perpetuating social formation, was seen to be on an unsustainable path, was the relentless drive of acquisitors to acquire ever more capital. Over time, this activity was seen to gain momentum and result in financial booms and busts. A depression would then follow and as it came on top of extreme inequality it would quickly bring social chaos and revolt. As anarchy was not a normal state of affairs, the class of military leaders would step in the breach and reestablish order and thereby usher in a new age of "commanders". In this context, Batra reviews a prior such social change, which occurred two millennia ago, when the Roman Republic was transformed into the Roman Empire. At that time slave uprisings were common but were violently suppressed.

This period became known as the Servile Wars. At the same time, the military was in ascendancy as the Roman Army continued to expand the empire. The pivotal figure in the development was the military leader, Julius Caesar, who wrested control from the Senate by diluting its membership, but was in turn murdered by the disgruntled Senators. The military class, led by his adopted son Octavian, cemented the new social order. Batra thinks such a scenario in the future will refocus the social motivity, away from acquisition of money to a mastery of technology and physical bravery including the conquest of space, heralding a new age of commanders in the West. These ideas contrast starkly with those of thinkers like Francis Fukuyama who argues in The End of History and the Last Man that capitalism, as it is based on democracy and freedom, represents the pinnacle of human social development. For Fukuyama, the collapse of Soviet Communism could have been inevitable, but not that of Capitalism.

== Bestsellers ==
Ravi Batra is the author of six international bestsellers, two of which appeared on The New York Times list. In 1980 he published Muslim Civilization and the Crisis in Iran where he predicted the fall of the Shah and the rise of a class of intellectuals, or Mullahs, followed by a drawn out war with Iraq. In 1984, he penned what was to become his first bestseller, first under the title Regular Cycles of Money, Inflation, Regulation and Depressions. A central theme of this book was that the mal-distribution of wealth, which Batra found to be the cause of past episodes of financial speculative manias that were followed by a crash and depression. Lester Thurow was so impressed that he wrote a preface stating the ideas were "novel and brilliant". This book was subsequently renamed as The Great Depression of 1990. It entered the New York Times Best Seller list in the Non-fiction category in early 1987 and reached #1 later that year.

== Outcomes of predictions ==
Batra predicted a full scale depression in the US in 1990; it did not happen. Batra's reputation rose in Europe on account of his correct prediction for the Fall of Communism when he was awarded the Medal of the Italian Senate in 1990. Batra continued to publish bestselling works in Japan with economic malaise lasting until the early 2000s. In the US, however, his sales began to drop and his booming side-line career as a media commentator on matters economic and financial began to sour. In 1993, Batra received the Ig Nobel Prize in economics. On September 9, 2007, Batra predicted:

A political revolution will take place in the United States by the end of this decade ... by around 2010. And the revolution could go on for four or five years before it is complete. So, from 2010 to 2016 we could see major changes in US economy and society. It will be a peaceful revolution and it will bring an end to the rule of money in society.

== Recent works ==
In 1993, Batra published The Myth of Free Trade: The Pooring of America in which he argued that free trade has enabled the rich to become richer but most people became poorer. Batra predicted that NAFTA would create unemployment in Mexico and lower wages in America. He urged the breakup of large firms, a raise in tariffs, and a drastic cut in defense spending to turn the country around. In his view, domestic monopolies generate inequality and poverty and global trade damages the industrial base and the global environment.

In 1998, he published Stock Market Crashes of 1998 and 1999: The Asian Crisis and Your Future. The book was revisiting the premise of his earlier bestselling work, arguing nothing had changed, only the palliative cures of economic policy had become more effective at suppressing the symptoms of financial capitalism, but not cure its underlying illness. He therefore predicted increasing stock market volatility. Again in 1999, he published a book The Crash of the Millennium: Surviving the Coming Inflationary Depression, which suggested a plunge in stocks. The drop in high-tech stocks in the Spring of 2000 sent a shiver through the global market place. However, his critics claimed that since the capitalist system remained relatively intact, that he was proven wrong. In 2004, he wrote a new book Greenspan's Fraud: How Two Decades of His Policies Have Undermined the Global Economy where he critically evaluates the policy prescriptions of Former Federal Reserve Chief Alan Greenspan.

In 2008 he published his book, The New Golden Age: The Coming Revolution against Political Corruption and Economic Chaos, where he analyzes the present day economic downturn and the forces behind it. After some significant struggle, Batra predicts a "swift and stunning" revival of American ideals based on true democratic principles that will quickly spread around the world:

The United States does not export much, but it does export ideas, which today mainly emit hedonism and materialism. A new standard exalting martial qualities and magnanimity will soon replace the currently dominant American ethos. It will also sound the death knell for tricklism which is creating poverty around the world. America's revolutionary ideas will quickly captivate the globe; they will spread like wildfire and eradicate poverty within a generation. The internet will make sure that the renaissance spreads its fragrance all over the planet. Verily, for the first time in history, there will be a Golden Age.(Pg. 204)

== Publications ==
=== Books ===
- Batra, Raveendra (1989). Studies in the pure theory of international trade. New York: St. Martin's Press. ISBN 9780312772109.
- Batra, Raveendra (1975). The pure theory of international trade under undercertainty. London: Macmillan. ISBN 9780333165607.
- Batra, Raveendra N. (1978). The Downfall of Capitalism and Communism: A New Study of History. London: Macmillan. ISBN 9780333216453.
- Batra, Raveendra (1989). Regular economic cycles: money, inflation, regulation and depressions. New York: St. Martin's Press. ISBN 9780312032609.
- Batra, Raveendra (1987). The great depression of 1990: Why it's got to happen – How to protect yourself. New York: Simon & Schuster. ISBN 9780671640224.
- Batra, Raveendra (1989). Surviving the great depression of 1990: protect your assets and investments – and come out on top. New York: Dell Publishing. ISBN 9780440204619.
- Batra, Raveendra (1989). Progressive utilization theory: Prout: an economic solution to poverty in the Third World. Ermita, Manila, Philippines: Ananda Marga Publications. ISBN 9789718623077.
- Batra, Ravi (1990). The downfall of capitalism and communism: can capitalism be saved. Dallas, Texas: Venus Books Distributed by Taylor Pub. Co. ISBN 9780939352098.
- Batra, Ravi (1993). The myth of free trade: a plan for America's economic revival. New York Toronto New York: C. Scribner's Sons Maxwell Macmillan Canada Maxwell Macmillan International. ISBN 9780684195926.
- Batra, Ravi (1996). The great American deception: what politicians won't tell you about our economy and your future. New York: John Wiley & Sons. ISBN 9780471165569.
- Batra, Ravi (1999). The crash of the millennium: surviving the coming inflationary depression. New York: Harmony Books. ISBN 9780609605127.
- Batra, Ravi (2003). Common sense macroeconomics. Richardson, Texas: Liberty Press. ISBN 9780939352869.
- Batra, Ravi (2005). Greenspan's fraud: how two decades of his policies have undermined the global economy. New York: Palgrave Macmillan. ISBN 9781403968593.
- Batra, Ravi (2007). The new golden age: the coming revolution against political corruption and economic chaos. New York: Palgrave Macmillan. ISBN 9781403975799.
- Batra, Ravi (2015). End unemployment now: how to eliminate joblessness, debt, and poverty despite congress. New York: Palgrave Macmillan. ISBN 9781137280077.

=== Journal articles ===
- Batra, Raveendra N.; Pattanaik, Prasanta K. (October 1972). "On some suggestions for having non-binary social choice functions". Theory and Decision. 3 (1). Springer: 1–11. doi:10.1007/BF00139349. S2CID 121130018.
- Batra, Ravi; Beladi, Hamid (September 2013). "The US trade deficit and the rate of interest". Review of International Economics. 21 (4). Wiley Online: 614–626. doi:10.1111/roie.12059. hdl:10.1111/roie.12059. S2CID 154137956.
- Batra, Ravi; Beladi, Hamid (November 2013). "Foreign capital and urban congestion in emerging markets". Review of Development Economics. 17 (4). Wiley Online: 676–684. doi:10.1111/rode.12058.

== See also ==
- Free trade controversy
- List of Ig Nobel Prize winners
- Progressive utilization theory
