= Journal of Business Research =

- Discipline: Business
- Language: English
- Edited by: Dipayan Biswas, Mirella Kleijnen

Publication details
- History: 1973-present
- Publisher: Elsevier
- Frequency: Monthly
- Impact factor: 11.1 (2025)

Standard abbreviations
- ISO 4: J. Bus. Res.

Indexing
- CODEN: JBRED4
- ISSN: 0148-2963
- LCCN: 77643139
- OCLC no.: 173702027

Links
- Journal homepage

The Journal of Business Research is a monthly peer-reviewed academic journal covering research on all aspects of business. It was established in 1973 and is published by Elsevier. The editors-in-chief are Dipayan Biswas (University of South Florida) and Mirella Kleijnen (Vrije Universiteit Amsterdam).

== Abstracting and indexing ==
The journal is abstracted and indexed in Current Contents/Social & Behavioral Sciences, PsycINFO/Psychological Abstracts, RePEc, Scopus, and the Social Sciences Citation Index. According to the Journal Citation Reports, the journal has a 2025 impact factor of 11.1.
