= Rob J. Hyndman =

Australian statistician (born 1967)

Rob J. Hyndman FAA FASSA
- Born: 2 May 1967 (age 59); Melbourne, Victoria
- Education: University of Melbourne
- Known for: Forecasting research
- Awards: Moran Medal (2007); Pitman Medal (2021)
- Scientific career
- Fields: Statistics
- Workplaces: Monash University
- Thesis: Continuous-Time Threshold Autoregressive Modelling (1992)
- Doctoral advisor: Peter J. Brockwell; Gary K. Grunwald
- Website: robjhyndman.com

Robin John Hyndman (born 2 May 1967) is an Australian statistician known for his work on forecasting and time series. He is a Professor of Statistics at Monash University and was Editor-in-Chief of the International Journal of Forecasting from 2005–2018. In 2007, he won the Moran Medal from the Australian Academy of Science for his contributions to statistical research. In 2021, he won the Pitman Medal from the Statistical Society of Australia.

Hyndman is co-creator and proponent of the scale-independent forecast error measurement metric mean absolute scaled error (MASE). Common metrics of forecast error, such as mean absolute error, geometric mean absolute error, and mean squared error, have shortcomings related to dependence on scale of data and/or handling zeros and negative values within the data. Hyndman's MASE metric resolves these and can be used under any forecast generation method. It allows for comparison between models due to its scale-free property.

Hyndman studied statistics and mathematics at the University of Melbourne, where he earned a Bachelor of Science with first class honours and a PhD. He was elected Fellow of the Academy of the Social Sciences in Australia in 2020, and Fellow of the Australian Academy of Science in 2021.

== Major books ==
- Makridakis, S., Wheelwright, S., and Hyndman, R.J. (1998) Forecasting: methods and applications, Wiley.
- Hyndman, R.J., Koehler, A.B., Ord, J.K., and Snyder, R.D. (2008) Forecasting with exponential smoothing: the state space approach, Springer.
- Hyndman, R.J., and Athanasopoulos, G. (2014) Forecasting: principles and practice, OTexts. (self-published)
- Hyndman, R.J. (2015) Unbelievable, CreateSpace. (self-published)
