= Journal of Forecasting =

- Discipline: Forecasting
- Language: English
- Edited by: Derek W. Bunn

Publication details
- History: 1982-present
- Publisher: John Wiley & Sons
- Frequency: 8/year
- Impact factor: 2.4 (2022)

Standard abbreviations
- ISO 4: J. Forecast.

Indexing
- ISSN: 0277-6693 (print); 1099-131X (web)

Links
- Journal homepage; Online access; Online archive

The Journal of Forecasting is a peer-reviewed academic journal published eight times per year by John Wiley & Sons. The journal was established in 1982 and covers all aspects of forecasting, including subject areas such as statistics, economics, psychology, systems engineering, and social sciences.

According to the Journal Citation Reports, the journal has a 2022 impact factor of 2.4.
