= International Journal of Forecasting =

- Discipline: Forecasting
- Language: English
- Edited by: Pierre Pinson

Publication details
- History: 1985–present
- Publisher: Elsevier on behalf of the International Institute of Forecasters
- Frequency: Quarterly
- Impact factor: 7.9 (2022)

Standard abbreviations
- ISO 4: Int. J. Forecast.

Indexing
- CODEN: IJFOEK
- ISSN: 0169-2070
- LCCN: 86651335
- OCLC no.: 12658569

Links
- Journal homepage; Online access; Journal page on publisher's website

The International Journal of Forecasting is a quarterly peer-reviewed scientific journal on forecasting. It is published by Elsevier on behalf of the International Institute of Forecasters. Its objective is to "unify the field of forecasting and to bridge the gap between theory and practice, making forecasting useful and relevant for decision and policy makers". The journal was established in 1985. According to the Journal Citation Reports, the journal has a 2022 impact factor of 7.9.

== Editors-in-chief ==
The editors-in-chief of the journal have been:

- Pierre Pinson (2019–)
- Esther Ruiz (2019)
- Rob J. Hyndman (2005–2018)
- Jan G. de Gooijer (1998–2004)
- Robert Fildes (1988–1998)
- J. Scott Armstrong (1988–1989)
- Spyros Makridakis (1985–1987)
