= Kuragama Grama Niladhari Division =

Kuragama
- Grama Niladhari Division
- Interactive map of Kuragama
- Coordinates: 7.352779°N 80.517998°E
- Country: Sri Lanka
- Province: Central Province
- District: Kandy District
- Divisional Secretariat: Thumpane Divisional Secretariat
- Electoral District: Kandy Electoral District
- Polling Division: Galagedara Polling Division

Area
  - Total: 1.12 km^{2} (0.43 sq mi)
- Elevation: 346 m (1,135 ft)

Population (2012)
  - Total: 800
  - Density: 714/km^{2} (1,850/sq mi)
- ISO 3166 code: LK-2103295

Kuragama

Kuragama Grama Niladhari Division is a Grama Niladhari Division of the Thumpane Divisional Secretariat of Kandy District of Central Province, Sri Lanka. It has Grama Niladhari Division Code 365.

Pelenegama, Pohaliyadda, Girantalawa and Poholiadda are located within, nearby or associated with Kuragama.

Kuragama is a surrounded by the Kuragama North, Paranagama, Pavulpawa, Poholiyadda, Hiyadala and Wettewa Grama Niladhari Divisions.

== Demographics ==
=== Ethnicity ===
The Kuragama Grama Niladhari Division has a Sinhalese majority (99.8%). In comparison, the Thumpane Divisional Secretariat (which contains the Kuragama Grama Niladhari Division) has a Sinhalese majority (92.3%)

Ethnicity in Kuragama
1. Sinhalese (99.8%)
2. Other (0.20%)

=== Religion ===
The Kuragama Grama Niladhari Division has a Buddhist majority (99.5%). In comparison, the Thumpane Divisional Secretariat (which contains the Kuragama Grama Niladhari Division) has a Buddhist majority (91.8%)

Religion in Kuragama
1. Buddhist (99.5%)
2. Other (0.50%)
