= Error metric =

An Error Metric is a type of Metric used to measure the error of a forecasting model. They can provide a way for forecasters to quantitatively compare the performance of competing models. Some common error metrics are:

- Mean Squared Error (MSE)
- Root Mean Square Error (RMSE)
- Mean absolute error (MAE)
- Mean Absolute Scaled Error (MASE)
- Mean Absolute Percentage Error (MAPE)
- Symmetric Mean Absolute Percentage Error (SMAPE)
