= Forecast attainment =

Statistical forecasting technique

Calculating forecast attainment periodically (monthly for example) provides visibility to the overall achievement of the plan and the total business bias. The time period of shipping activity should be compared against the forecast that was set for the time period a specific number of days/months prior which is call Lag. Lag is based on the leadtime from order placement to order delivery. For example, if the lead time of an order is three months, then the forecast snapshot should be Lag 3 months.

$$\text{Forecast Attainment} = \frac{\sum(\text{Total Shipments For the Time Period})}{\sum(\text{Total Forecast For the Time Period as of the Lag Snapshot})}$$

== Usage ==
Used together with forecast accuracy and forecast bias to have a complete view of the impact of forecasting errors on operations.

- Forecast Attainment is used to judge the overall achievement of the demand or supply plan and identify top level bias of the plan
- Weighted Forecast Accuracy or mean absolute percentage error is used to measure the “health” of the product mix of the forecast
- Forecast Bias is used to measure the stock keeping unit level tendency to constantly under or over forecast

== Example interpretations ==
When used in a sales and operations planning meeting the results of forecast attainment should be reviewed and appropriate action taken:

- Consistent over attainment of forecasts could result in out of stocks or service problems if operations does not have the capacity or agility to respond to the over attainment.
- Consistent under attainment of forecasts could potentially lead to excess and obsolete inventory. Business agility is needed to stop or slow down supply.

== See also ==
- Demand forecasting
- Forecast bias
- Sales and operations planning
