= Viharagama (Nikaweratiya) Grama Niladhari Division =

Viharagama
- Grama Niladhari Division
- Interactive map of Viharagama
- Coordinates: 7.739961°N 80.105123°E
- Country: Sri Lanka
- Province: North Western Province
- District: Kurunegala District
- Divisional Secretariat: Nikaweratiya Divisional Secretariat
- Electoral District: Kurunegala Electoral District
- Polling Division: Nikaweratiya Polling Division

Area
  - Total: 2.66 km^{2} (1.03 sq mi)
- Elevation: 47 m (154 ft)

Population (2012)
  - Total: 891
  - Density: 335/km^{2} (870/sq mi)
- ISO 3166 code: LK-6121195

Viharagama

Viharagama Grama Niladhari Division is a Grama Niladhari Division of the Nikaweratiya Divisional Secretariat of Kurunegala District of North Western Province, Sri Lanka. It has Grama Niladhari Division Code 295.

Viharagama is a surrounded by the Danduwawa, Mawathagama, Nikaweratiya South, Budumuttawa, Millagoda and Nikaweratiya North Grama Niladhari Divisions.

== Demographics ==
=== Ethnicity ===
The Viharagama Grama Niladhari Division has a Sinhalese majority (99.7%). In comparison, the Nikaweratiya Divisional Secretariat (which contains the Viharagama Grama Niladhari Division) has a Sinhalese majority (95.6%)

Ethnicity in Viharagama
1. Sinhalese (99.7%)
2. Other (0.30%)

=== Religion ===
The Viharagama Grama Niladhari Division has a Buddhist majority (98.0%). In comparison, the Nikaweratiya Divisional Secretariat (which contains the Viharagama Grama Niladhari Division) has a Buddhist majority (93.9%)

Religion in Viharagama
1. Buddhist (98.0%)
2. Roman Catholic (1.50%)
3. Other (0.60%)
