= Hathigammana Grama Niladhari Division =

Hathigammana
- Grama Niladhari Division
- Interactive map of Hathigammana
- Coordinates: 7.764598°N 80.098391°E
- Country: Sri Lanka
- Province: North Western Province
- District: Kurunegala District
- Divisional Secretariat: Nikaweratiya Divisional Secretariat
- Electoral District: Kurunegala Electoral District
- Polling Division: Nikaweratiya Polling Division

Area
  - Total: 2.44 km^{2} (0.94 sq mi)
- Elevation: 31 m (102 ft)

Population (2012)
  - Total: 972
  - Density: 398/km^{2} (1,030/sq mi)
- ISO 3166 code: LK-6121085

Hathigammana

Hathigammana Grama Niladhari Division is a Grama Niladhari Division of the Nikaweratiya Divisional Secretariat of Kurunegala District of North Western Province, Sri Lanka. It has Grama Niladhari Division Code 305.

Hathigammana is a surrounded by the Budumuttawa, Diyagama, Hewenpelessa, Galapitiyagama, Kebellewa and Kaluwennewa Grama Niladhari Divisions.

== Demographics ==
=== Ethnicity ===
The Hathigammana Grama Niladhari Division has a Sinhalese majority (94.3%). In comparison, the Nikaweratiya Divisional Secretariat (which contains the Hathigammana Grama Niladhari Division) has a Sinhalese majority (95.6%)

Ethnicity in Hathigammana
1. Sinhalese (94.3%)
2. Moor (5.70%)
3. Other (0.00%)

=== Religion ===
The Hathigammana Grama Niladhari Division has a Buddhist majority (93.2%). In comparison, the Nikaweratiya Divisional Secretariat (which contains the Hathigammana Grama Niladhari Division) has a Buddhist majority (93.9%)

Religion in Hathigammana
1. Buddhist (93.2%)
2. Muslim (5.70%)
3. Other (1.10%)
