= Ganegama (Panduwasnuwara West) Grama Niladhari Division =

Ganegama
- Grama Niladhari Division
- Interactive map of Ganegama
- Coordinates: 7.651755°N 80.078609°E
- Country: Sri Lanka
- Province: North Western Province
- District: Kurunegala District
- Divisional Secretariat: Panduwasnuwara West Divisional Secretariat
- Electoral District: Kurunegala Electoral District
- Polling Division: Panduwasnuwara Polling Division

Area
  - Total: 5.34 km^{2} (2.06 sq mi)
- Elevation: 53 m (174 ft)

Population (2012)
  - Total: 725
  - Density: 136/km^{2} (350/sq mi)
- ISO 3166 code: LK-6145020

Ganegama

Ganegama Grama Niladhari Division is a Grama Niladhari Division of the Panduwasnuwara West Divisional Secretariat of Kurunegala District of North Western Province, Sri Lanka . It has Grama Niladhari Division Code 1328.

Ganegama is a surrounded by the Alahenegama, Beliwewa, Dothella, Mandapola, Rambewa and Madulla Grama Niladhari Divisions.

== Demographics ==
=== Ethnicity ===
The Ganegama Grama Niladhari Division has a Sinhalese majority (99.9%) . In comparison, the Panduwasnuwara West Divisional Secretariat (which contains the Ganegama Grama Niladhari Division) has a Sinhalese majority (86.8%) and a significant Moor population (12.6%)

Ethnicity in Ganegama
1. Sinhalese (99.9%)
2. Other (0.10%)

=== Religion ===
The Ganegama Grama Niladhari Division has a Buddhist majority (97.8%) . In comparison, the Panduwasnuwara West Divisional Secretariat (which contains the Ganegama Grama Niladhari Division) has a Buddhist majority (83.6%) and a significant Muslim population (12.8%)

Religion in Ganegama
1. Buddhist (97.8%)
2. Roman Catholic (2.10%)
3. Other (0.10%)
