= Sales transformation =

Sales transformation is a change management discipline that enables company executives to improve sales performance by aligning resources that relate to sales, management, marketing, and customer service, or improving sales talent and sales operations.

The goals of a sales transformation initiative are typically to help the board drive the company toward its revenue goals, to improve customer intimacy, to allow the head of sales to hit their revenue targets, and to empower salespeople to earn more money.
