= Weather Central =

American meteorology data company

Weather Central, LP
- Trade name: Weather Central
- Company type: Subsidiary
- Industry: Weather forecasting
- Founded: Wisconsin, United States (1974)
- Founder: Terry Kelly
- Headquarters: Madison, Wisconsin, United States
- Area served: Worldwide
- Key people: Terry Kelly (Founder and CEO); Christopher Kelly (President)
- Owner: Weather Services International
- Number of employees: 180
- Website: www.wxc.com

Weather Central, LP is a private company that provides weather data and production tools to the media industry. It was founded in 1974 by Terry Kelly.

== Overview ==
The company has 180 employees and 70 meteorologists. It is the largest provider of broadcast and interactive web weather solutions for media companies in the United States, Canada, Mexico, and the Philippines. Weather Central has about 400 broadcast television clients in 21 countries worldwide. Weather Central also developed a free application for iPhones and Android devices called MyWeather.

== Acquisitions ==
In 2011, E.L. Rothschild LLC, an investment company, acquired a 70% stake in Weather Central. Nonetheless, the company will continue to operate under CEO and founder, Terry Kelly, as well as current management.

In 2012, Weather Services International, a sister company to The Weather Channel, announced an agreement to acquire Weather Central. Weather Central also launched the Radar 5™, a radar widget built using HTML5.

== See also ==
- Egain forecasting
