= Marketing engineering =

Marketing engineering is currently defined as "a systematic approach to harness data and knowledge to drive effective marketing decision making and implementation through a technology-enabled and model-supported decision process".

== History ==
The term marketing engineering can be traced back to Lilien et al. in "The Age of Marketing Engineering" published in 1998; in this article the authors define marketing engineering as the use of computer decision models for making marketing decisions. Marketing managers typically use "conceptual marketing", that is they develop a mental model of the decision situation based on past experience, intuition and reasoning. That approach has its limitations though: experience is unique to every individual, there is no objective way of choosing between the best judgments of multiple individuals in such a situation and furthermore judgment can be influenced by the person's position in the firm's hierarchy. In the same year Lilien G. L. and A. Rangaswamy published Marketing Engineering: Computer-Assisted Marketing Analysis and Planning, Fildes and Ventura praised the book in their review, while noting that a fuller discussion of market share models and econometric models would have made the book better for teaching and that "conceptual marketing" should not be discarded in the presence of marketing engineering, but that both approaches should be used together. Leeflang and Wittink (2000) have identified five eras of model building in marketing:

1. (1950-1965) The first era of application of operations research and management science to marketing
2. (1965-1970) Adaptation of models to fit marketing problems
3. (1970-1985) Emphasis on models that are an acceptable representation of reality and are easy to use
4. (1985-2000) Increase interest in marketing decision support systems, meta-analyses and studies of the generalizability of results
5. (2000- . ) Growth of new exchange systems (ex: e-commerce) and need for new modeling approaches

Since the 2010s, the growth of cloud-based marketing platforms, customer data infrastructure, and digital advertising ecosystems has broadened the scope of marketing engineering. In the 2020s, the adoption of generative AI, predictive analytics, and marketing automation has extended the field to encompass the design of integrated systems for marketing data, decisioning, activation, and measurement.

How to build market models and how to develop a structured approach to marketing questions has been an issue of active discussion between researchers, L. Lilien and A. Rangaswamy (2001) have observed that while having data gives a competitive advantage, having too much data without the models and systems for working with it may turn out to be as bad as not having the data. Lodish (2001) observed that the most complicated and elegant model will not necessarily be the one adopted in the firm, good models are the ones that capture the trade-offs of decision making, subjective estimates may be necessary to complete the model, risk needs to be taken into account, model complexity must be balanced versus ease of understanding, models should integrate tactical with strategic aspects. Migley (2002) identifies four purposes in codifying marketing knowledge:

1. To facilitate the progress of marketing as a science
2. To promote the discipline within its institutional and professional environments
3. To better educate and credential the potential manager
4. To provide competitive advantage to the firm

Lilien et al.(2002) define marketing engineering as "the systematic process of putting marketing data and knowledge to practical use through the planning, design, and construction of decision aids and marketing management support systems (MMSSs)". One the driving factors toward the development of marketing engineering are the use of high-powered personal computers connected to LANs and WANs, the exponential growth in the volume of data, the reengineering of marketing functions. The effectiveness of the implementation of marketing engineering and MMSSs in the firm depend on the decision situation characteristics(demand), the nature of the MMSS (supply), match between supply and demand, design characteristics of the MMSS, characteristics of implementation process. Wider adoption depend on difference between end-user systems and high-end systems, user training and the growth of the Internet.

== Market response models ==
All market response models include:

- Inputs: price, advertising, selling effort, product design, market size, competitive environment
- Response Model: links inputs to outputs such as product perceptions, sales, profits
- Objectives: used to evaluate actions such as sales

== Models ==
In marketing engineering methods and models can be classified in several categories:

=== Customer value assessment ===
- Objective measures: internal engineering assessment, indirect survey questions, field value-in-use assessment
- Perceptual measures: focus groups, direct survey questions, importance ratings, conjoint analysis, benchmarking
- Behavioral measures: choice models, data mining

=== Segmentation and targeting ===
- Reducing data: factor analysis
- Association measures: cluster analysis
- Outlier detection and removal
- Forming Segments: cluster analysis
- Profiling Segments: discriminant analysis

=== Positioning ===
- Perceptual maps: similitarity-based methods, attribute-based methods
- Preference maps: ideal-point model, vector model
- Joint-space maps: averaged ideal-point model, averaged vector model, external analysis

=== Forecasting ===
- Judgmental methods: sales force composite estimates, jury of executive opinion, Delphi method, scenario analysis
- Market and Survey Analysis: buyer intentions, Product testing, chain ratio
- Time Series: naive methods, moving averages, exponential smoothing, Box–Jenkins method, decompositional methods
- Causal analyses: regression analysis, econometric models, input-output models, multivariate ARMA, neural networks
- New product forecasting models: Bass Model, ASSESSOR model

=== New product and service design ===
- Creativity software: idea generation, idea evaluation, GE/Mckinsey portfolio model, conjoint analysis

=== Marketing mix ===
- Pricing: classic approach, cost-oriented pricing, demand-oriented pricing, competition-oriented pricing
- Promotion: affordable method, percentage-of-sales method, competitive parity method, objective-and-task method
- Sales force decisions: intuitive methods, market-response methods, response functions
