= Sales territory =

Geographic area or customer group managed by a sales representative

A sales territory is the customer group or geographical area for which an individual salesperson or a sales team holds responsibility. Territories can be defined on the basis of geography, sales potential, history, or a combination of factors. Companies strive to balance their territories because this can reduce costs and increase sales. The structure of a sales territory can vary by salesperson or sales team depending on the product they sell or the company that they work for. When determining sales territories, companies must consider factors such as product pricing, sales frequency, and associated costs to ensure effective market coverage.

== Purpose ==
A sales territory is intended to create balanced sales coverage across a sales force. According to standard analyses, territories are compared based on factors such as potential and workload to prevent disparities. If territories are significantly unbalanced, sales personnel may be given too much or too little work, leading to under‑servicing or over‑servicing of customers. Balanced territory design helps prevent inefficient resource allocation, reduces unfairness in sales potential distribution, and supports both salesperson satisfaction and company performance.

Territories also serve to define clear areas of responsibility for individual sales representatives. Assigning well‑defined territories helps each salesperson understand exactly which customers or accounts they are responsible for, supporting improved accountability and performance measurement.

"When sales personnel are stretched too thin, the result can be an under-servicing of customers. This can cost a firm business because over-taxed salespeople engage in sub-optimal levels of activity in a number of areas. They seek out too few leads, identify too few prospects, and spend too little time with current customers. Those customers, in turn, may take their business to alternate providers."

"Over-servicing, by contrast, may raise costs and prices and therefore indirectly reduce sales. Over-servicing in some territories may also lead to under-servicing in others."

"Unbalanced territories also raise the problem of unfair distribution of sales potential among members of a sales force. This may result in distorted compensation and cause talented salespeople to leave a company, seeking superior balance and compensation."

"Achieving an appropriate balance among territories is an important factor in maintaining satisfaction among customers, salespeople, and the company as a whole."

"Sales potential forecast" can be used to determine sales targets and to help identify territories worthy of an allocation of limited resources. A sales potential forecast is a forecast of the number of prospects and their buying power. It does not assess the likelihood of converting "potential" accounts. Sales potential can be represented in a number of ways. Of these, the most basic is population, i.e., the number of potential accounts in a territory. In a survey of nearly 200 senior marketing managers, 62 percent responded that they found the "sales potential forecast" metric very useful.

== Construction ==
"In defining or redefining territories, companies strive to balance workloads, balance sales potential, develop compact territories, and minimize disruptions during the redesigns. These goals can have different effects on different stakeholders. . . . Before designing new territories, a sales force manager should evaluate the workloads of all members of the sales team."

The workload for a territory can be calculated as follows:

Workload (#) = [Current accounts (#) * Average time to service an active account (#)] + [Prospects (#) * Time spent trying to convert a prospect into an active account (#)]

The sales potential in a territory can be determined as follows:

Sales potential ($) = Number of possible accounts (#) x Buying power ($)

"Buying power is a dollar figure based on such factors as average income levels, number of businesses in a territory, average sales of those businesses, and population demographics. Buying power indices are generally specific to individual industries," but on a whole, definitions of buying power tend to be more an art than a science.

"In addition to workload and sales potential, a third key metric is needed to compare territories. This is size or, more specifically, travel time. In this context, travel time is more useful than size because it more accurately represents the factor that size implies – that is, the amount of time needed to reach customers and potential customers."

"As a manager's goal is to balance workload and potential among sales personnel, it can be beneficial to calculate combined metrics – such as sales potential travel time – in order to make comparisons between territories."

"Sales potential can be represented in a number of ways. Of these, the most basic is population – the number of potential accounts in a territory. . . . Estimating the size of a territory might involve simply calculating the geographic area that it covers. It is likely, however, that average travel time will also be important. Depending on the quality of roads, density of traffic, or distance between businesses, one may find that territories of equal area entail very different travel time requirements. In evaluating such distinctions, sales force records of the time needed to travel from call to call can be useful. Specialized computer software programs are available for these purposes."

"Redefining territories is a famously difficult process. To perform it well, in addition to the metrics cited earlier, disruption of customer relationships and feelings of ownership among sales personnel must also be considered."

== See also ==
- Choice architecture
- Customer relationship management
- Customer service
- Demand forecasting
- Point of sale
- Sales management
- Sales operations
- Sales promotion
