= Mean directional accuracy =

Metric to evaluate a forecasting method

Mean directional accuracy (MDA), also known as mean direction accuracy, is a measure of prediction accuracy of a forecasting method in statistics. It compares the forecast direction (upward or downward) to the actual realized direction. It is defined by the following formula:

$$\frac{1}{N}\sum_t \mathbf{1}_{\sgn(A_t - A_{t-1}) = \sgn(F_t - A_{t-1})}$$

where A_{t} is the actual value at time t and F_{t} is the forecast value at time t. Variable N represents number of forecasting points. The function $\sgn(\cdot)$ is sign function and $\mathbf{1}$ is the indicator function.

In simple words, MDA provides the probability that the under study forecasting method can detect the correct direction of the time series. MDA is a popular metric for forecasting performance in economics and finance.

MDA is used in economics applications where the economist is often interested only in directional movement of variable of interest. As an example in macroeconomics, a monetary authority who wants to know the direction of the inflation, to raise or decrease interest rates if inflation is predicted to rise or drop respectively. Another example can be found in financial planning where the user wants to know if the demand has increasing direction or decreasing trend.

== Comparison to other forecasting metrics ==
Many techniques, such as mean absolute percentage error or median absolute deviation, evaluate forecasting and provided information about the accuracy and value of the forecasts. While accuracy, as measured by quantitative errors, is important, it may be more crucial to accurately forecast the direction of change. Directional accuracy is similar to a binary evaluation. The metric only considers the upward or downward direction in the time series and is independent of quantitive value of increase or decrease. For example, will prices rise or fall? How much it will increase or decrease can be detected by other forecasting metrics.
