= Forecast by analogy =

Forecast by analogy is a forecasting method that assumes that two different kinds of phenomena share the same model of behaviour. For example, one way to predict the sales of a new product is to choose an existing product which "looks like" the new product in terms of the expected demand pattern for sales of the product.

"Used with care, an analogy is a form of scientific model that can be used to analyze and explain the behavior of other phenomena."

According to some experts, research has shown that the careful application of analogies improves the accuracy of the forecast.

== See also ==
- Case-based reasoning
