= Panduwasnuwara Polling Division =

Panduwasnuwara
- Polling Division
- Coordinates: 7.584317°N 80.101880°E
- Country: Sri Lanka
- Province: North Western Province, Sri Lanka
- Electoral District: Kurunegala Electoral District

Area
  - Total: 300.15 km^{2} (115.89 sq mi)

Population (2012)
  - Total: 96,128
  - Density: 320/km^{2} (830/sq mi)
- ISO 3166 code: EC-15F

The Panduwasnuwara Polling Division is a polling division in the Kurunegala Electoral District, in the North Western Province, Sri Lanka.

== Presidential election results ==
=== Summary ===
The winner of Panduwasnuwara has matched the final country result 6 out of 8 times. Hence, Panduwasnuwara is a weak bellwether for presidential elections.

Year	Panduwasnuwara	Kurunegala Electoral District	MAE %	Sri Lanka	MAE %
2019	SLPP	SLPP	1.25%	SLPP	3.81%
2015	UPFA	UPFA	2.21%	NDF	7.83%
2010	UPFA	UPFA	1.42%	UPFA	3.48%
2005	UPFA	UPFA	1.88%	UPFA	0.13%
1999	PA	PA	1.75%	PA	1.11%
1994	PA	PA	0.28%	PA	3.28%
1988	SLFP	UNP	2.85%	UNP	3.42%
1982	UNP	UNP	0.81%	UNP	2.52%
Matches/Mean MAE	6/8	7/8	1.56%	8/8	3.20%

=== 2019 Sri Lankan presidential election ===
Party	Panduwasnuwara		Kurunegala Electoral District		Sri Lanka	
Party	Votes	%	Votes	%	Votes	%
SLPP	35,508	57.01%	652,278	57.90%	6,924,255	52.25%
NDF	24,238	38.92%	416,961	37.01%	5,564,239	41.99%
NMPP	1,441	2.31%	36,178	3.21%	418,553	3.16%
Other Parties (with < 1%)	1,092	1.75%	21,193	1.88%	345,452	2.61%
Valid Votes	62,279	99.33%	1,126,610	99.25%	13,252,499	98.99%
Rejected Votes	419	0.67%	8,522	0.75%	135,452	1.01%
Total Polled	62,698	85.33%	1,135,132	85.24%	13,387,951	83.71%
Registered Electors	73,474		1,331,705		15,992,568	

=== 2015 Sri Lankan presidential election ===
Party	Panduwasnuwara		Kurunegala Electoral District		Sri Lanka	
Party	Votes	%	Votes	%	Votes	%
UPFA	32,197	55.73%	556,868	53.46%	5,768,090	47.58%
NDF	25,172	43.57%	476,602	45.76%	6,217,162	51.28%
Other Parties (with < 1%)	407	0.70%	8,154	0.78%	138,200	1.14%
Valid Votes	57,776	99.31%	1,041,624	99.12%	12,123,452	98.85%
Rejected Votes	403	0.69%	9,285	0.88%	140,925	1.15%
Total Polled	58,179	78.51%	1,050,909	78.82%	12,264,377	78.69%
Registered Electors	74,100		1,333,377		15,585,942	

=== 2010 Sri Lankan presidential election ===
Party	Panduwasnuwara		Kurunegala Electoral District		Sri Lanka	
Party	Votes	%	Votes	%	Votes	%
UPFA	32,854	61.66%	582,784	63.08%	6,015,934	57.88%
NDF	19,681	36.94%	327,594	35.46%	4,173,185	40.15%
Other Parties (with < 1%)	750	1.41%	13,515	1.46%	204,494	1.97%
Valid Votes	53,285	99.50%	923,893	99.29%	10,393,613	99.03%
Rejected Votes	270	0.50%	6,644	0.71%	101,838	0.97%
Total Polled	53,555	76.36%	930,537	75.59%	10,495,451	66.70%
Registered Electors	70,131		1,230,966		15,734,587	

=== 2005 Sri Lankan presidential election ===
Party	Panduwasnuwara		Kurunegala Electoral District		Sri Lanka	
Party	Votes	%	Votes	%	Votes	%
UPFA	26,365	50.36%	468,507	52.26%	4,887,152	50.29%
UNP	25,456	48.63%	418,809	46.72%	4,706,366	48.43%
Other Parties (with < 1%)	529	1.01%	9,181	1.02%	123,521	1.27%
Valid Votes	52,350	99.26%	896,497	99.07%	9,717,039	98.88%
Rejected Votes	392	0.74%	8,458	0.93%	109,869	1.12%
Total Polled	52,742	78.69%	904,955	77.87%	9,826,908	69.51%
Registered Electors	67,023		1,162,099		14,136,979	

=== 1999 Sri Lankan presidential election ===
Party	Panduwasnuwara		Kurunegala Electoral District		Sri Lanka	
Party	Votes	%	Votes	%	Votes	%
PA	22,991	53.16%	377,483	50.77%	4,312,157	51.12%
UNP	18,484	42.74%	326,327	43.89%	3,602,748	42.71%
JVP	1,197	2.77%	27,354	3.68%	343,927	4.08%
Other Parties (with < 1%)	580	1.34%	12,355	1.66%	176,679	2.09%
Valid Votes	43,252	98.11%	743,519	97.99%	8,435,754	97.69%
Rejected Votes	835	1.89%	15,272	2.01%	199,536	2.31%
Total Polled	44,087	75.14%	758,791	75.83%	8,635,290	72.17%
Registered Electors	58,677		1,000,624		11,965,536	

=== 1994 Sri Lankan presidential election ===
Party	Panduwasnuwara		Kurunegala Electoral District		Sri Lanka	
Party	Votes	%	Votes	%	Votes	%
PA	23,158	59.08%	403,838	59.36%	4,709,205	62.28%
UNP	15,482	39.49%	266,740	39.21%	2,715,283	35.91%
Other Parties (with < 1%)	560	1.43%	9,766	1.44%	137,040	1.81%
Valid Votes	39,200	98.70%	680,344	98.48%	7,561,526	98.03%
Rejected Votes	515	1.30%	10,511	1.52%	151,706	1.97%
Total Polled	39,715	75.41%	690,855	76.97%	7,713,232	69.12%
Registered Electors	52,667		897,539		11,158,880	

=== 1988 Sri Lankan presidential election ===
Party	Panduwasnuwara		Kurunegala Electoral District		Sri Lanka	
Party	Votes	%	Votes	%	Votes	%
SLFP	12,131	49.91%	182,220	46.89%	2,289,857	44.95%
UNP	11,747	48.33%	198,662	51.12%	2,569,199	50.43%
SLMP	430	1.77%	7,717	1.99%	235,701	4.63%
Valid Votes	24,308	98.95%	388,599	98.91%	5,094,754	98.24%
Rejected Votes	259	1.05%	4,281	1.09%	91,499	1.76%
Total Polled	24,567	51.09%	392,880	53.49%	5,186,256	55.87%
Registered Electors	48,087		734,453		9,283,143	

=== 1982 Sri Lankan presidential election ===
Party	Panduwasnuwara		Kurunegala Electoral District		Sri Lanka	
Party	Votes	%	Votes	%	Votes	%
UNP	21,475	56.93%	345,769	55.77%	3,450,815	52.93%
SLFP	14,991	39.74%	248,479	40.08%	2,546,348	39.05%
JVP	1,048	2.78%	21,835	3.52%	273,428	4.19%
Other Parties (with < 1%)	207	0.55%	3,895	0.63%	249,460	3.83%
Valid Votes	37,721	98.99%	619,978	99.13%	6,520,156	98.78%
Rejected Votes	384	1.01%	5,431	0.87%	80,470	1.22%
Total Polled	38,105	87.89%	625,409	86.00%	6,600,626	80.15%
Registered Electors	43,356		727,202		8,235,358	

== Parliamentary election results ==
=== Summary ===
The winner of Panduwasnuwara has matched the final country result 6 out of 7 times. Hence, Panduwasnuwara is a bellwether for Parliamentary Elections.

Year	Panduwasnuwara	Kurunegala Electoral District	MAE %	Sri Lanka	MAE %
2015	UPFA	UPFA	1.28%	UNP	4.03%
2010	UPFA	UPFA	8.91%	UPFA	7.06%
2004	UPFA	UPFA	3.42%	UPFA	5.02%
2001	UNP	UNP	1.07%	UNP	4.34%
2000	PA	PA	1.66%	PA	2.51%
1994	PA	PA	0.87%	PA	2.87%
1989	UNP	UNP	1.86%	UNP	5.21%
Matches/Mean MAE	6/7	6/7	2.73%	7/7	4.43%

=== 2015 Sri Lankan parliamentary election ===
Party	Panduwasnuwara		Kurunegala Electoral District		Sri Lanka	
Party	Votes	%	Votes	%	Votes	%
UPFA	27,006	51.27%	474,124	49.29%	4,732,664	42.48%
UNP	23,883	45.34%	441,275	45.87%	5,098,916	45.77%
JVP	1,511	2.87%	41,077	4.27%	544,154	4.88%
Other Parties (with < 1%)	272	0.52%	5,496	0.57%	83,041	0.75%
Valid Votes	52,672	95.37%	961,972	95.39%	11,140,333	95.35%
Rejected Votes	2,538	4.60%	46,036	4.56%	516,926	4.42%
Total Polled	55,228	74.53%	1,008,459	79.63%	11,684,111	77.66%
Registered Electors	74,100		1,266,443		15,044,490	

=== 2010 Sri Lankan parliamentary election ===
Party	Panduwasnuwara		Kurunegala Electoral District		Sri Lanka	
Party	Votes	%	Votes	%	Votes	%
UPFA	21,953	55.43%	429,316	63.91%	4,846,388	60.38%
UNP	16,847	42.54%	213,713	31.81%	2,357,057	29.37%
DNA	716	1.81%	26,440	3.94%	441,251	5.50%
Other Parties (with < 1%)	87	0.22%	2,288	0.34%	34,779	0.43%
Valid Votes	39,603	92.69%	671,757	92.58%	8,026,322	96.03%
Rejected Votes	3,092	7.24%	53,130	7.32%	581,465	6.96%
Total Polled	42,727	60.92%	725,566	59.08%	8,358,246	59.29%
Registered Electors	70,131		1,228,044		14,097,690	

=== 2004 Sri Lankan parliamentary election ===
Party	Panduwasnuwara		Kurunegala Electoral District		Sri Lanka	
Party	Votes	%	Votes	%	Votes	%
UPFA	22,103	48.77%	412,157	51.95%	4,223,126	45.70%
UNP	21,297	46.99%	340,768	42.95%	3,486,792	37.73%
JHU	1,803	3.98%	37,459	4.72%	552,723	5.98%
Other Parties (with < 1%)	122	0.27%	2,976	0.38%	64,640	0.70%
Valid Votes	45,325	95.10%	793,360	95.14%	9,241,931	94.52%
Rejected Votes	2,319	4.87%	40,261	4.83%	534,452	5.47%
Total Polled	47,658	73.34%	833,908	76.54%	9,777,821	75.74%
Registered Electors	64,979		1,089,482		12,909,631	

=== 2001 Sri Lankan parliamentary election ===
Party	Panduwasnuwara		Kurunegala Electoral District		Sri Lanka	
Party	Votes	%	Votes	%	Votes	%
UNP	23,125	49.68%	382,768	48.59%	4,086,026	45.62%
PA	20,093	43.17%	332,775	42.24%	3,330,815	37.19%
JVP	2,875	6.18%	63,652	8.08%	815,353	9.10%
Other Parties (with < 1%)	456	0.98%	8,533	1.08%	133,770	1.49%
Valid Votes	46,549	95.77%	787,728	95.35%	8,955,844	94.77%
Rejected Votes	2,056	4.23%	38,451	4.65%	494,009	5.23%
Total Polled	48,605	77.60%	826,179	78.98%	9,449,878	76.03%
Registered Electors	62,636		1,046,102		12,428,762	

=== 2000 Sri Lankan parliamentary election ===
Party	Panduwasnuwara		Kurunegala Electoral District		Sri Lanka	
Party	Votes	%	Votes	%	Votes	%
PA	20,849	47.25%	358,794	48.75%	3,899,329	45.33%
UNP	19,348	43.85%	308,106	41.86%	3,451,765	40.12%
JVP	1,830	4.15%	40,780	5.54%	518,725	6.03%
NUA	1,302	2.95%	11,927	1.62%	185,593	2.16%
Other Parties (with < 1%)	798	1.81%	16,421	2.23%	221,514	2.57%
Valid Votes	44,127	N/A	736,028	N/A	8,602,617	N/A

=== 1994 Sri Lankan parliamentary election ===
Party	Panduwasnuwara		Kurunegala Electoral District		Sri Lanka	
Party	Votes	%	Votes	%	Votes	%
PA	21,295	51.15%	366,856	51.87%	3,887,805	48.94%
UNP	20,011	48.07%	332,547	47.02%	3,498,370	44.04%
Other Parties (with < 1%)	326	0.78%	7,876	1.11%	158,616	2.00%
Valid Votes	41,632	95.97%	707,279	95.92%	7,943,688	95.20%
Rejected Votes	1,747	4.03%	30,071	4.08%	400,395	4.80%
Total Polled	43,379	82.36%	737,350	82.15%	8,344,095	74.75%
Registered Electors	52,667		897,580		11,163,064	

=== 1989 Sri Lankan parliamentary election ===
Party	Panduwasnuwara		Kurunegala Electoral District		Sri Lanka	
Party	Votes	%	Votes	%	Votes	%
UNP	16,853	56.70%	314,724	58.51%	2,838,005	50.71%
SLFP	11,417	38.41%	195,526	36.35%	1,785,369	31.90%
ELJP	1,071	3.60%	13,759	2.56%	67,723	1.21%
Other Parties (with < 1%)	380	1.28%	13,907	2.59%	232,463	4.15%
Valid Votes	29,721	94.97%	537,916	94.02%	5,596,468	93.87%
Rejected Votes	1,573	5.03%	34,212	5.98%	365,563	6.13%
Total Polled	31,294	65.87%	572,128	72.88%	5,962,031	63.60%
Registered Electors	47,509		784,991		9,374,164	

== Demographics ==
=== Ethnicity ===
The Panduwasnuwara Polling Division has a Sinhalese majority (90.1%). In comparison, the Kurunegala Electoral District (which contains the Panduwasnuwara Polling Division) has a Sinhalese majority (91.4%)

Ethnicity in Panduwasnuwara
1. Sinhalese (90.1%)
2. Moor (9.40%)
3. Other (0.50%)

=== Religion ===
The Panduwasnuwara Polling Division has a Buddhist majority (87.4%) . In comparison, the Kurunegala Electoral District (which contains the Panduwasnuwara Polling Division) has a Buddhist majority (88.5%)

Religion in Panduwasnuwara
1. Buddhist (87.4%)
2. Muslim (9.50%)
3. Roman Catholic (2.60%)
4. Other (0.50%)
