= Sales operations =

Business activities related to sales objectives

Sales operations is a set of business activities and processes that help a sales organization run effectively, efficiently and in support of business strategies and objectives. Sales operations may also be referred to as sales, sales support, or business operations.

== Categories ==
The set of sales operations activities vary from company to company but often include these five categories:

=== Sales force enablement ===
- Sales process development
- Sales process adoption and compliance
- Sales development
- Sales training
- Sales force communications management

=== Business analytics ===
- Sales metrics
- Sales forecasting

=== Sales administration ===
- Proposal/contract development
- Vendor selection and management
- Planning process stewardship

=== Attainment planning ===
- Incentive sales compensation plan design
- Go-to-market (GTM) strategy alignment with roles and components
- Territory analysis and definition
- Goal setting

=== Sales operations mandate and design ===
- Chief of staff to the sales organization
- Stewardship of sales force capacity
- Initiative change management
- Sales operations team design
- Sales operations talent management

The sales operations team members are often liaisons for sales to other parts of the organisation such as finance, marketing, legal, QA and IT departments. They represent the needs of sales in meetings and cross-functional projects.

More and more companies are forming sales operations departments within their organizations and, per the sales operations excellence center, sales operations is an established process and considered to be vital contributor to business operations and accounting functions.

Sales operation analysts as a department usually have sales analysts who work directly under them, supplying them with the data needed to make decisions. These decisions can transform a fragmented and stilted model into a customer-adaptive enterprise.

Nowadays, many businesses use internet tools to improve sales function.

== Sales strategy ==
The UK's Institute of Directors argues that every growing business requires an effective sales strategy. A clearly thought out strategy supported by clear objectives and a good understanding of the requirements of customers and the business's market environment can contribute to better sales outcomes.

== Sales target ==
A sales target is the minimum sales goal for a set time span. A sales target may be a minimum amount of value (monetary) or product sold (volume). Sales targets may also be for sales activities, such as number of calls per day. Management usually sets the sales targets and the sales territory. The time span could be set for the day, week, month, fiscal quarter or year.

In some businesses, staff pay includes earn a bonus that a member of staff may earn for reaching a specific sales target.

== Sales territory ==
A sales territory is usually the customer group or geographical area assigned to an individual salesperson or a sales team. The geographical area may also be assigned to a franchisee, distributor, or agent. A territory may also be assigned by industry verticals, such as all retailers or all wholesalers in a geographical area. A sales territory may be as large as a continent, country, state or province, or as small as a precinct, suburb, town or city. Generally, a sales manager will assign a sales territory based on the territories of the sales resources reporting to him/her.

== Sales forecasting ==
Sales forecasting uses past sales figures to predict the short-term or long-term future performance to enable sound financial planning. Historical sales and/or economic data is often used to improve the forecast of sales.

For shops and stores, market research may yield the following indicators for deriving initial forecasts:

- average sales volume per unit area for similar shops in similar locations of similar size
- number of consumers or consumer households in appropriate vicinity of the store and their annual expenses on the product in question.

== Relation to Revenue Operations ==
In recent years, Revenue Operations (RevOps) has emerged as an expanded organizational function that builds on sales operations by aligning sales, marketing, and customer success under a unified operational strategy. Whereas sales operations is focused on optimizing sales team performance and enabling sales-focused processes, RevOps aims to streamline the full revenue lifecycle—breaking down functional silos and supporting cross-functional data flow and decision-making.

== See also ==
- Choice architecture
- Customer relationship management
- Customer service
- Demand forecasting
- Mobile sales enablement
- Point of sale
- Retailing
- Sales (accounting)
- Sales incentive plan
- Sales management
- Sales process engineering
- Sales promotion
- Sales territory
- Sales variance
- Selling
- Trade
- Transaction
