= Fourt–Woodlock equation =

Market-research tool describing the total volume of consumer product purchases per year

The Fourt–Woodlock equation (sometimes misspelled Fort-Woodlock equation) is a market research tool to describe the total volume of consumer product purchases per year based on households which initially make trial purchases of the product and those households which make a repeat purchase within the first year. Since it includes the effects of initial trial and repeat rates, the equation is useful in new product development.

The Fourt–Woodlock equation itself is

$$V = (HH \cdot TR \cdot TU) + (HH\cdot TR\cdot MR \cdot RR \cdot RU)$$

The left-hand-side of the equation is the volume of purchases per unit time (usually taken to be one year). On the right-hand-side, the first parentheses describes trial volume, and the second describes repeat volume.

HH is the total number of households in the geographic area of projection, and TR ("trial rate") is the percentage of those households which will purchase the product for the first time in a given time period. TU ("trial units") is the number of units purchased on this first purchase occasion. MR is "measured repeat," or the percentage of those who tried the product who will purchase it at least one more time within the first year of the product's launch. RR is the repeats per repeater: the number of repeat purchases within that same year. RU is the number of repeat units purchased on each repeat event.

The applied science of product forecasting is used to estimate each term on the right-hand-side of this equation. Estimating the trial rate is complex and typically requires sophisticated models to predict, while the number of households is usually well known (except in some unusually complicated markets such as China).
