= Demand sensing =

Demand sensing is a demand forecasting method that uses data mining and real-time data capture to create a forecast of demand based on the current realities of the supply chain.

Traditionally, forecasting accuracy was based on time series techniques which create a forecast based on prior sales history and draws on several years of data to provide insights into predictable seasonal patterns. Demand sensing uses a broader range of demand signals, (including current data from the supply chain) and different mathematics to create a forecast that responds to real-world events such as market shifts, weather changes, natural disasters and changes in consumer buying behavior.
