= Galagedara Polling Division =

Galagedara
- Polling Division
- Coordinates: 7.355015°N 80.496718°E
- Country: Sri Lanka
- Province: Central Province, Sri Lanka
- Electoral District: Kandy Electoral District

Area
  - Total: 117.05 km^{2} (45.19 sq mi)

Population (2012)
  - Total: 67,628
  - Density: 578/km^{2} (1,500/sq mi)
- ISO 3166 code: EC-04A

The Galagedara Polling Division is a Polling Division in the Kandy Electoral District, in the Central Province, Sri Lanka.

== Presidential Election Results ==
=== Summary ===
The winner of Galagedara has matched the final country result 6 out of 8 times. Hence, Galagedara is a Weak Bellwether for Presidential Elections.

Year	Galagedara	Kandy Electoral District	MAE %	Sri Lanka	MAE %
2019	SLPP	SLPP	5.94%	SLPP	3.85%
2015	UPFA	NDF	7.05%	NDF	3.78%
2010	UPFA	UPFA	4.26%	UPFA	0.60%
2005	UNP	UNP	1.45%	UPFA	4.44%
1999	PA	PA	2.00%	PA	3.46%
1994	PA	PA	3.69%	PA	9.25%
1988	UNP	UNP	1.08%	UNP	1.94%
1982	UNP	UNP	1.94%	UNP	2.79%
Matches/Mean MAE	6/8	7/8	3.43%	8/8	3.76%

=== 2019 Sri Lankan Presidential Election ===
Party	Galagedara		Kandy Electoral District		Sri Lanka	
Party	Votes	%	Votes	%	Votes	%
SLPP	24,829	56.76%	471,502	50.43%	6,924,255	52.25%
NDF	16,839	38.49%	417,355	44.64%	5,564,239	41.99%
Other Parties (with < 1%)	1,118	2.56%	22,479	2.40%	345,452	2.61%
NMPP	959	2.19%	23,539	2.52%	418,553	3.16%
Valid Votes	43,745	99.37%	934,875	99.04%	13,252,499	98.99%
Rejected Votes	277	0.63%	9,020	0.96%	135,452	1.01%
Total Polled	44,022	85.26%	943,895	84.89%	13,387,951	83.71%
Registered Electors	51,632		1,111,860		15,992,568	

=== 2015 Sri Lankan Presidential Election ===
Party	Galagedara		Kandy Electoral District		Sri Lanka	
Party	Votes	%	Votes	%	Votes	%
UPFA	21,466	51.34%	378,585	44.23%	5,768,090	47.58%
NDF	19,818	47.39%	466,994	54.56%	6,217,162	51.28%
Other Parties (with < 1%)	531	1.27%	10,329	1.21%	138,200	1.14%
Valid Votes	41,815	99.08%	855,908	98.73%	12,123,452	98.85%
Rejected Votes	390	0.92%	10,993	1.27%	140,925	1.15%
Total Polled	42,205	77.85%	866,901	79.71%	12,264,377	78.69%
Registered Electors	54,214		1,087,542		15,585,942	

=== 2010 Sri Lankan Presidential Election ===
Party	Galagedara		Kandy Electoral District		Sri Lanka	
Party	Votes	%	Votes	%	Votes	%
UPFA	22,703	58.46%	406,636	54.16%	6,015,934	57.88%
NDF	15,338	39.49%	329,492	43.89%	4,173,185	40.15%
Other Parties (with < 1%)	795	2.05%	14,658	1.95%	204,494	1.97%
Valid Votes	38,836	99.23%	750,786	98.85%	10,393,613	99.03%
Rejected Votes	300	0.77%	8,700	1.15%	101,838	0.97%
Total Polled	39,136	74.47%	759,486	75.87%	10,495,451	66.70%
Registered Electors	52,553		1,001,074		15,734,587	

=== 2005 Sri Lankan Presidential Election ===
Party	Galagedara		Kandy Electoral District		Sri Lanka	
Party	Votes	%	Votes	%	Votes	%
UNP	20,177	52.72%	387,150	54.33%	4,706,366	48.43%
UPFA	17,453	45.61%	315,672	44.30%	4,887,152	50.29%
Other Parties (with < 1%)	639	1.67%	9,798	1.37%	123,521	1.27%
Valid Votes	38,269	99.01%	712,620	98.64%	9,717,039	98.88%
Rejected Votes	382	0.99%	9,817	1.36%	109,869	1.12%
Total Polled	38,651	75.94%	722,437	77.37%	9,826,908	69.51%
Registered Electors	50,898		933,754		14,136,979	

=== 1999 Sri Lankan Presidential Election ===
Party	Galagedara		Kandy Electoral District		Sri Lanka	
Party	Votes	%	Votes	%	Votes	%
PA	16,777	48.25%	308,187	50.29%	4,312,157	51.12%
UNP	16,428	47.24%	276,360	45.10%	3,602,748	42.71%
JVP	933	2.68%	15,512	2.53%	343,927	4.08%
Other Parties (with < 1%)	636	1.83%	12,752	2.08%	176,679	2.09%
Valid Votes	34,774	98.20%	612,811	97.29%	8,435,754	97.69%
Rejected Votes	637	1.80%	17,060	2.71%	199,536	2.31%
Total Polled	35,411	75.96%	629,871	77.61%	8,635,290	72.17%
Registered Electors	46,621		811,606		11,965,536	

=== 1994 Sri Lankan Presidential Election ===
Party	Galagedara		Kandy Electoral District		Sri Lanka	
Party	Votes	%	Votes	%	Votes	%
PA	17,288	52.99%	320,110	56.64%	4,709,205	62.28%
UNP	14,862	45.55%	235,519	41.68%	2,715,283	35.91%
Other Parties (with < 1%)	475	1.46%	9,488	1.68%	137,040	1.81%
Valid Votes	32,625	98.44%	565,117	97.55%	7,561,526	98.03%
Rejected Votes	517	1.56%	14,179	2.45%	151,706	1.97%
Total Polled	33,142	76.26%	579,296	77.85%	7,713,232	69.12%
Registered Electors	43,462		744,151		11,158,880	

=== 1988 Sri Lankan Presidential Election ===
Party	Galagedara		Kandy Electoral District		Sri Lanka	
Party	Votes	%	Votes	%	Votes	%
UNP	15,071	53.92%	234,124	54.88%	2,569,199	50.43%
SLFP	12,549	44.90%	186,187	43.65%	2,289,857	44.95%
SLMP	330	1.18%	6,266	1.47%	235,701	4.63%
Valid Votes	27,950	99.07%	426,577	98.57%	5,094,754	98.24%
Rejected Votes	263	0.93%	6,167	1.43%	91,499	1.76%
Total Polled	28,213	71.12%	432,744	68.36%	5,186,256	55.87%
Registered Electors	39,671		633,030		9,283,143	

=== 1982 Sri Lankan Presidential Election ===
Party	Galagedara		Kandy Electoral District		Sri Lanka	
Party	Votes	%	Votes	%	Votes	%
UNP	17,778	57.56%	289,621	59.80%	3,450,815	52.93%
SLFP	11,874	38.44%	178,647	36.89%	2,546,348	39.05%
JVP	1,092	3.54%	12,493	2.58%	273,428	4.19%
Other Parties (with < 1%)	144	0.47%	3,536	0.73%	249,460	3.83%
Valid Votes	30,888	99.31%	484,297	99.07%	6,520,156	98.78%
Rejected Votes	214	0.69%	4,548	0.93%	80,470	1.22%
Total Polled	31,102	86.54%	488,845	89.44%	6,600,626	80.15%
Registered Electors	35,940		546,565		8,235,358	

== Parliamentary Election Results ==
=== Summary ===
The winner of Galagedara has matched the final country result 5 out of 7 times. Hence, Galagedara is a Weak Bellwether for Parliamentary Elections.

Year	Galagedara	Kandy Electoral District	MAE %	Sri Lanka	MAE %
2015	UNP	UNP	4.95%	UNP	3.46%
2010	UPFA	UPFA	3.22%	UPFA	2.92%
2004	UNP	UNP	2.43%	UPFA	4.53%
2001	UNP	UNP	0.82%	UNP	5.07%
2000	PA	PA	2.01%	PA	2.71%
1994	UNP	UNP	2.23%	PA	6.99%
1989	UNP	UNP	3.41%	UNP	8.48%
Matches/Mean MAE	5/7	5/7	2.72%	7/7	4.88%

=== 2015 Sri Lankan Parliamentary Election ===
Party	Galagedara		Kandy Electoral District		Sri Lanka	
Party	Votes	%	Votes	%	Votes	%
UNP	19,522	50.90%	440,761	55.61%	5,098,916	45.77%
UPFA	17,231	44.93%	309,152	39.00%	4,732,664	42.48%
JVP	1,287	3.36%	30,669	3.87%	544,154	4.88%
Other Parties (with < 1%)	311	0.81%	12,055	1.52%	100,088	0.90%
Valid Votes	38,351	96.04%	792,637	95.48%	11,140,333	95.35%
Rejected Votes	1,558	3.90%	37,065	4.46%	516,926	4.42%
Total Polled	39,933	73.66%	830,165	79.13%	11,684,111	77.66%
Registered Electors	54,214		1,049,160		15,044,490	

=== 2010 Sri Lankan Parliamentary Election ===
Party	Galagedara		Kandy Electoral District		Sri Lanka	
Party	Votes	%	Votes	%	Votes	%
UPFA	18,198	64.22%	339,819	60.81%	4,846,388	60.38%
UNP	8,836	31.18%	192,798	34.50%	2,357,057	29.37%
DNA	1,209	4.27%	23,728	4.25%	441,251	5.50%
Other Parties (with < 1%)	94	0.33%	2,459	0.44%	30,354	0.38%
Valid Votes	28,337	90.36%	558,804	90.49%	8,026,322	96.03%
Rejected Votes	3,007	9.59%	58,333	9.45%	581,465	6.96%
Total Polled	31,361	59.67%	617,559	61.70%	8,358,246	59.29%
Registered Electors	52,553		1,000,861		14,097,690	

=== 2004 Sri Lankan Parliamentary Election ===
Party	Galagedara		Kandy Electoral District		Sri Lanka	
Party	Votes	%	Votes	%	Votes	%
UNP	16,645	48.61%	313,859	49.99%	3,486,792	37.73%
UPFA	15,896	46.42%	268,131	42.71%	4,223,126	45.70%
JHU	1,513	4.42%	42,192	6.72%	552,723	5.98%
Other Parties (with < 1%)	187	0.55%	3,684	0.59%	64,227	0.69%
Valid Votes	34,241	93.14%	627,866	93.24%	9,241,931	94.52%
Rejected Votes	2,523	6.86%	45,484	6.75%	534,452	5.47%
Total Polled	36,764	73.58%	673,380	76.47%	9,777,821	75.74%
Registered Electors	49,964		880,634		12,909,631	

=== 2001 Sri Lankan Parliamentary Election ===
Party	Galagedara		Kandy Electoral District		Sri Lanka	
Party	Votes	%	Votes	%	Votes	%
UNP	18,180	53.38%	314,297	52.77%	4,086,026	45.62%
PA	13,721	40.28%	233,637	39.23%	3,330,815	37.19%
JVP	1,688	4.96%	37,146	6.24%	815,353	9.10%
Other Parties (with < 1%)	471	1.38%	10,496	1.76%	129,347	1.44%
Valid Votes	34,060	94.37%	595,576	93.40%	8,955,844	94.77%
Rejected Votes	2,032	5.63%	42,103	6.60%	494,009	5.23%
Total Polled	36,092	74.20%	637,679	76.03%	9,449,878	76.03%
Registered Electors	48,642		838,687		12,428,762	

=== 2000 Sri Lankan Parliamentary Election ===
Party	Galagedara		Kandy Electoral District		Sri Lanka	
Party	Votes	%	Votes	%	Votes	%
PA	16,051	46.72%	282,282	46.66%	3,899,329	45.33%
UNP	15,399	44.82%	243,623	40.27%	3,451,765	40.12%
JVP	1,144	3.33%	21,565	3.56%	518,725	6.03%
NUA	1,048	3.05%	32,023	5.29%	185,593	2.16%
Other Parties (with < 1%)	715	2.08%	25,435	4.20%	289,668	3.37%
Valid Votes	34,357	N/A	604,928	N/A	8,602,617	N/A

=== 1994 Sri Lankan Parliamentary Election ===
Party	Galagedara		Kandy Electoral District		Sri Lanka	
Party	Votes	%	Votes	%	Votes	%
UNP	18,240	54.65%	301,824	52.35%	3,498,370	44.04%
PA	14,762	44.23%	267,683	46.43%	3,887,805	48.94%
Other Parties (with < 1%)	373	1.12%	7,045	1.22%	175,576	2.21%
Valid Votes	33,375	95.29%	576,552	94.89%	7,943,688	95.20%
Rejected Votes	1,648	4.71%	31,019	5.11%	400,395	4.80%
Total Polled	35,023	80.58%	607,571	81.67%	8,344,095	74.75%
Registered Electors	43,462		743,939		11,163,064	

=== 1989 Sri Lankan Parliamentary Election ===
Party	Galagedara		Kandy Electoral District		Sri Lanka	
Party	Votes	%	Votes	%	Votes	%
UNP	16,777	66.24%	204,973	61.72%	2,838,005	50.71%
SLFP	7,686	30.35%	105,977	31.91%	1,785,369	31.90%
SLMC	495	1.95%	14,697	4.43%	202,016	3.61%
USA	288	1.14%	5,147	1.55%	141,983	2.54%
Other Parties (with < 1%)	81	0.32%	1,315	0.40%	67,723	1.21%
Valid Votes	25,327	95.12%	332,109	93.69%	5,596,468	93.87%
Rejected Votes	1,298	4.88%	22,374	6.31%	365,563	6.13%
Total Polled	26,625	68.71%	354,483	56.42%	5,962,031	63.60%
Registered Electors	38,747		628,317		9,374,164	

== Demographics ==
=== Ethnicity ===
The Galagedara Polling Division has a Sinhalese majority (92.6%) . In comparison, the Kandy Electoral District (which contains the Galagedara Polling Division) has a Sinhalese majority (74.4%) and a significant Moor population (13.9%)

Ethnicity in Galagedara
1. Sinhalese (92.6%)
2. Moor (6.00%)
3. Sri Lankan Tamil (1.00%)
4. Other (0.40%)

=== Religion ===
The Galagedara Polling Division has a Buddhist majority (92.3%) . In comparison, the Kandy Electoral District (which contains the Galagedara Polling Division) has a Buddhist majority (73.4%) and a significant Muslim population (14.3%)

Religion in Galagedara
1. Buddhist (92.3%)
2. Muslim (6.20%)
3. Other (1.50%)
