= Customer demand planning =

Business planning process

Customer demand planning (CDP) is a business planning process that allows sales teams to develop demand forecasts as input to service-planning processes, production, inventory planning and revenue planning.

== Definition ==
CDP is an aspect of managing value chains. Generally, the first step of CDP is to forecast product demand. A manager can plan resource deployment in accordance with the resulting forecasts. It's a bottom-up approach vs. top down planning. Associated risks with this method are: Low forecast accuracy and numbers of planners required. There are various software systems that are designed to forecast demand and plan operations. To test the added value of implementing this bottom-up approach, applications are providing simulation functionalities to estimate the resulting demand forecast accuracy (e.g. POS sales; sales invoices; shipments, etc.)

In the manufacturer to retailer model, customer collaborative partnerships have become more common since the 1990s. Although there was industry support behind CPFR (Collaborative Planning, Forecasting and Replenishment), manufacturers and retailers are adopting different versions of collaborative forecasting and replenishment strategies. These include collaborative-VMI, CPFR, account based forecasting, CMI, shared single forecast and replenishment etc.

=== Discovering markets ===
The challenges and complexities faced by the retailer are somewhat different from the challenges faced by suppliers (manufacturers and distributors). The demand management technology for the merchant is somewhat different from that of the brand or manufacturer on the supply-side. Customer demand planning aims at matching customer supply planning logic and implies CPFR type collaboration. Aspects of demand management include customer experience, demand creation, inventory and pricing optimization, channel management, sourcing, transportation optimization and advanced practices in technology.

== See also ==
- Demand management
- Forecasting
- Inventory control
