= Nikaweratiya Polling Division =

Nikaweratiya
- Polling Division
- Coordinates: 7.762894°N 80.086628°E
- Country: Sri Lanka
- Province: North Western Province, Sri Lanka
- Electoral District: Kurunegala Electoral District

Area
  - Total: 627.34 km^{2} (242.22 sq mi)

Population (2012)
  - Total: 119,583
  - Density: 191/km^{2} (490/sq mi)
- ISO 3166 code: EC-15B

The Nikaweratiya Polling Division is a Polling Division in the Kurunegala Electoral District, in the North Western Province, Sri Lanka.

== Presidential Election Results ==
=== Summary ===
The winner of Nikaweratiya has matched the national election result in seven of the eight presidential elections held. Hence, Nikaweratiya is a Strong bellwether for presidential elections.

Year	Nikaweratiya	Kurunegala Electoral District	MAE %	Sri Lanka	MAE %
2019	SLPP	SLPP	1.41%	SLPP	3.66%
2015	UPFA	UPFA	2.06%	NDF	7.70%
2010	UPFA	UPFA	1.44%	UPFA	6.33%
2005	UPFA	UPFA	0.18%	UPFA	1.65%
1999	PA	PA	1.06%	PA	1.75%
1994	PA	PA	2.60%	PA	0.41%
1988	UNP	UNP	3.39%	UNP	2.89%
1982	UNP	UNP	0.52%	UNP	2.33%
Matches/Mean MAE	7/8	7/8	1.58%	8/8	3.34%

=== 2019 Sri Lankan Presidential Election ===
Party	Nikaweratiya		Kurunegala Electoral District		Sri Lanka	
Party	Votes	%	Votes	%	Votes	%
SLPP	44,354	56.50%	652,278	57.90%	6,924,255	52.25%
NDF	30,286	38.58%	416,961	37.01%	5,564,239	41.99%
NMPP	2,194	2.79%	36,178	3.21%	418,553	3.16%
Other Parties (with < 1%)	1,673	2.13%	21,193	1.88%	345,452	2.61%
Valid Votes	78,507	99.40%	1,126,610	99.25%	13,252,499	98.99%
Rejected Votes	477	0.60%	8,522	0.75%	135,452	1.01%
Total Polled	78,984	84.92%	1,135,132	85.24%	13,387,951	83.71%
Registered Electors	93,010		1,331,705		15,992,568	

=== 2015 Sri Lankan Presidential Election ===
Party	Nikaweratiya		Kurunegala Electoral District		Sri Lanka	
Party	Votes	%	Votes	%	Votes	%
UPFA	40,015	55.47%	556,868	53.46%	5,768,090	47.58%
NDF	31,444	43.59%	476,602	45.76%	6,217,162	51.28%
Other Parties (with < 1%)	684	0.95%	8,154	0.78%	138,200	1.14%
Valid Votes	72,143	99.10%	1,041,624	99.12%	12,123,452	98.85%
Rejected Votes	658	0.90%	9,285	0.88%	140,925	1.15%
Total Polled	72,801	76.71%	1,050,909	78.82%	12,264,377	78.69%
Registered Electors	94,910		1,333,377		15,585,942	

=== 2010 Sri Lankan Presidential Election ===
Party	Nikaweratiya		Kurunegala Electoral District		Sri Lanka	
Party	Votes	%	Votes	%	Votes	%
UPFA	41,510	64.49%	582,784	63.08%	6,015,934	57.88%
NDF	21,830	33.91%	327,594	35.46%	4,173,185	40.15%
Other Parties (with < 1%)	1,029	1.60%	13,515	1.46%	204,494	1.97%
Valid Votes	64,369	99.33%	923,893	99.29%	10,393,613	99.03%
Rejected Votes	432	0.67%	6,644	0.71%	101,838	0.97%
Total Polled	64,801	73.72%	930,537	75.59%	10,495,451	66.70%
Registered Electors	87,897		1,230,966		15,734,587	

=== 2005 Sri Lankan Presidential Election ===
Party	Nikaweratiya		Kurunegala Electoral District		Sri Lanka	
Party	Votes	%	Votes	%	Votes	%
UPFA	32,978	52.07%	468,507	52.26%	4,887,152	50.29%
UNP	29,691	46.88%	418,809	46.72%	4,706,366	48.43%
Other Parties (with < 1%)	663	1.05%	9,181	1.02%	123,521	1.27%
Valid Votes	63,332	99.17%	896,497	99.07%	9,717,039	98.88%
Rejected Votes	532	0.83%	8,458	0.93%	109,869	1.12%
Total Polled	63,864	76.30%	904,955	77.87%	9,826,908	69.51%
Registered Electors	83,696		1,162,099		14,136,979	

=== 1999 Sri Lankan Presidential Election ===
Party	Nikaweratiya		Kurunegala Electoral District		Sri Lanka	
Party	Votes	%	Votes	%	Votes	%
PA	26,123	49.87%	377,483	50.77%	4,312,157	51.12%
UNP	23,694	45.23%	326,327	43.89%	3,602,748	42.71%
JVP	1,789	3.42%	27,354	3.68%	343,927	4.08%
Other Parties (with < 1%)	777	1.48%	12,355	1.66%	176,679	2.09%
Valid Votes	52,383	97.78%	743,519	97.99%	8,435,754	97.69%
Rejected Votes	1,191	2.22%	15,272	2.01%	199,536	2.31%
Total Polled	53,574	73.63%	758,791	75.83%	8,635,290	72.17%
Registered Electors	72,758		1,000,624		11,965,536	

=== 1994 Sri Lankan Presidential Election ===
Party	Nikaweratiya		Kurunegala Electoral District		Sri Lanka	
Party	Votes	%	Votes	%	Votes	%
PA	30,415	61.99%	403,838	59.36%	4,709,205	62.28%
UNP	17,932	36.55%	266,740	39.21%	2,715,283	35.91%
Other Parties (with < 1%)	720	1.47%	9,766	1.44%	137,040	1.81%
Valid Votes	49,067	98.33%	680,344	98.48%	7,561,526	98.03%
Rejected Votes	834	1.67%	10,511	1.52%	151,706	1.97%
Total Polled	49,901	77.45%	690,855	76.97%	7,713,232	69.12%
Registered Electors	64,434		897,539		11,158,880	

=== 1988 Sri Lankan Presidential Election ===
Party	Nikaweratiya		Kurunegala Electoral District		Sri Lanka	
Party	Votes	%	Votes	%	Votes	%
UNP	11,988	54.52%	198,662	51.12%	2,569,199	50.43%
SLFP	9,536	43.37%	182,220	46.89%	2,289,857	44.95%
SLMP	464	2.11%	7,717	1.99%	235,701	4.63%
Valid Votes	21,988	98.94%	388,599	98.91%	5,094,754	98.24%
Rejected Votes	235	1.06%	4,281	1.09%	91,499	1.76%
Total Polled	22,223	39.27%	392,880	53.49%	5,186,256	55.87%
Registered Electors	56,592		734,453		9,283,143	

=== 1982 Sri Lankan Presidential Election ===
Party	Nikaweratiya		Kurunegala Electoral District		Sri Lanka	
Party	Votes	%	Votes	%	Votes	%
UNP	24,544	56.50%	345,769	55.77%	3,450,815	52.93%
SLFP	17,307	39.84%	248,479	40.08%	2,546,348	39.05%
JVP	1,262	2.91%	21,835	3.52%	273,428	4.19%
Other Parties (with < 1%)	328	0.76%	3,895	0.63%	249,460	3.83%
Valid Votes	43,441	99.28%	619,978	99.13%	6,520,156	98.78%
Rejected Votes	314	0.72%	5,431	0.87%	80,470	1.22%
Total Polled	43,755	86.70%	625,409	86.00%	6,600,626	80.15%
Registered Electors	50,467		727,202		8,235,358	

== Parliamentary Election Results ==
=== Summary ===
The winner of Nikaweratiya has matched the final country result 6 out of 7 times. Nikaweratiya is a Strong Bellwether for Parliamentary Elections.

Year	Nikaweratiya	Kurunegala Electoral District	MAE %	Sri Lanka	MAE %
2015	UPFA	UPFA	1.72%	UNP	4.45%
2010	UPFA	UPFA	0.43%	UPFA	3.04%
2004	UPFA	UPFA	1.77%	UPFA	6.03%
2001	UNP	UNP	0.87%	UNP	3.76%
2000	PA	PA	0.56%	PA	2.37%
1994	PA	PA	3.29%	PA	3.23%
1989	UNP	UNP	1.76%	UNP	4.46%
Matches/Mean MAE	6/7	6/7	1.48%	7/7	3.90%

=== 2015 Sri Lankan Parliamentary Election ===
Party	Nikaweratiya		Kurunegala Electoral District		Sri Lanka	
Party	Votes	%	Votes	%	Votes	%
UPFA	33,344	51.44%	474,124	49.29%	4,732,664	42.48%
UNP	28,849	44.50%	441,275	45.87%	5,098,916	45.77%
JVP	2,337	3.61%	41,077	4.27%	544,154	4.88%
Other Parties (with < 1%)	295	0.46%	5,496	0.57%	83,041	0.75%
Valid Votes	64,825	94.17%	961,972	95.39%	11,140,333	95.35%
Rejected Votes	3,973	5.77%	46,036	4.56%	516,926	4.42%
Total Polled	68,836	72.53%	1,008,459	79.63%	11,684,111	77.66%
Registered Electors	94,910		1,266,443		15,044,490	

=== 2010 Sri Lankan Parliamentary Election ===
Party	Nikaweratiya		Kurunegala Electoral District		Sri Lanka	
Party	Votes	%	Votes	%	Votes	%
UPFA	28,687	63.66%	429,316	63.91%	4,846,388	60.38%
UNP	14,677	32.57%	213,713	31.81%	2,357,057	29.37%
DNA	1,486	3.30%	26,440	3.94%	441,251	5.50%
Other Parties (with < 1%)	213	0.47%	2,288	0.34%	34,779	0.43%
Valid Votes	45,063	89.95%	671,757	92.58%	8,026,322	96.03%
Rejected Votes	4,975	9.93%	53,130	7.32%	581,465	6.96%
Total Polled	50,098	57.00%	725,566	59.08%	8,358,246	59.29%
Registered Electors	87,897		1,228,044		14,097,690	

=== 2004 Sri Lankan Parliamentary Election ===
Party	Nikaweratiya		Kurunegala Electoral District		Sri Lanka	
Party	Votes	%	Votes	%	Votes	%
UPFA	29,545	54.65%	412,157	51.95%	4,223,126	45.70%
UNP	22,885	42.33%	340,768	42.95%	3,486,792	37.73%
JHU	1,427	2.64%	37,459	4.72%	552,723	5.98%
Other Parties (with < 1%)	209	0.39%	2,976	0.38%	64,640	0.70%
Valid Votes	54,066	92.92%	793,360	95.14%	9,241,931	94.52%
Rejected Votes	4,086	7.02%	40,261	4.83%	534,452	5.47%
Total Polled	58,185	72.07%	833,908	76.54%	9,777,821	75.74%
Registered Electors	80,736		1,089,482		12,909,631	

=== 2001 Sri Lankan Parliamentary Election ===
Party	Nikaweratiya		Kurunegala Electoral District		Sri Lanka	
Party	Votes	%	Votes	%	Votes	%
UNP	27,615	49.85%	382,768	48.59%	4,086,026	45.62%
PA	23,120	41.74%	332,775	42.24%	3,330,815	37.19%
JVP	4,204	7.59%	63,652	8.08%	815,353	9.10%
Other Parties (with < 1%)	458	0.83%	8,533	1.08%	133,770	1.49%
Valid Votes	55,397	94.26%	787,728	95.35%	8,955,844	94.77%
Rejected Votes	3,376	5.74%	38,451	4.65%	494,009	5.23%
Total Polled	58,773	75.81%	826,179	78.98%	9,449,878	76.03%
Registered Electors	77,522		1,046,102		12,428,762	

=== 2000 Sri Lankan Parliamentary Election ===
Party	Nikaweratiya		Kurunegala Electoral District		Sri Lanka	
Party	Votes	%	Votes	%	Votes	%
PA	25,831	48.23%	358,794	48.75%	3,899,329	45.33%
UNP	22,752	42.48%	308,106	41.86%	3,451,765	40.12%
JVP	2,607	4.87%	40,780	5.54%	518,725	6.03%
NUA	827	1.54%	11,927	1.62%	185,593	2.16%
Other Parties (with < 1%)	784	1.46%	14,604	1.98%	201,684	2.34%
PP	754	1.41%	1,817	0.25%	19,830	0.23%
Valid Votes	53,555	N/A	736,028	N/A	8,602,617	N/A

=== 1994 Sri Lankan Parliamentary Election ===
Party	Nikaweratiya		Kurunegala Electoral District		Sri Lanka	
Party	Votes	%	Votes	%	Votes	%
PA	28,351	55.37%	366,856	51.87%	3,887,805	48.94%
UNP	22,471	43.88%	332,547	47.02%	3,498,370	44.04%
Other Parties (with < 1%)	385	0.75%	7,876	1.11%	158,616	2.00%
Valid Votes	51,207	95.59%	707,279	95.92%	7,943,688	95.20%
Rejected Votes	2,365	4.41%	30,071	4.08%	400,395	4.80%
Total Polled	53,572	83.14%	737,350	82.15%	8,344,095	74.75%
Registered Electors	64,434		897,580		11,163,064	

=== 1989 Sri Lankan Parliamentary Election ===
Party	Nikaweratiya		Kurunegala Electoral District		Sri Lanka	
Party	Votes	%	Votes	%	Votes	%
UNP	19,342	59.03%	314,724	58.51%	2,838,005	50.71%
SLFP	10,653	32.51%	195,526	36.35%	1,785,369	31.90%
ELJP	1,315	4.01%	13,759	2.56%	67,723	1.21%
USA	1,022	3.12%	11,059	2.06%	141,983	2.54%
MEP	437	1.33%	2,848	0.53%	90,480	1.62%
Valid Votes	32,769	92.81%	537,916	94.02%	5,596,468	93.87%
Rejected Votes	2,539	7.19%	34,212	5.98%	365,563	6.13%
Total Polled	35,308	63.25%	572,128	72.88%	5,962,031	63.60%
Registered Electors	55,823		784,991		9,374,164	

== Demographics ==
=== Ethnicity ===
The Nikaweratiya Polling Division has a Sinhalese majority (91.7%) . In comparison, the Kurunegala Electoral District (which contains the Nikaweratiya Polling Division) has a Sinhalese majority (91.4%)

Ethnicity in Nikaweratiya
1. Sinhalese (91.7%)
2. Moor (7.90%)
3. Other (0.40%)

=== Religion ===
The Nikaweratiya Polling Division has a Buddhist majority (90.0%) . In comparison, the Kurunegala Electoral District (which contains the Nikaweratiya Polling Division) has a Buddhist majority (88.5%)

Religion in Nikaweratiya
1. Buddhist (90.0%)
2. Muslim (8.00%)
3. Roman Catholic (1.50%)
4. Other (0.50%)
