= Forecast bias =

Probabilistic or statistical property of the forecast error

A forecast bias occurs when there are consistent differences between actual outcomes and previously generated forecasts of those quantities; that is: forecasts may have a general tendency to be too high or too low. A normal property of a good forecast is that it is not biased.

As a quantitative measure, the "forecast bias" can be specified as a probabilistic or statistical property of the forecast error. A typical measure of bias of forecasting procedure is the arithmetic mean or expected value of the forecast errors, but other measures of bias are possible. For example, a median-unbiased forecast would be one where half of the forecasts are too low and half too high: see Bias of an estimator.

In contexts where forecasts are being produced on a repetitive basis, the performance of the forecasting system may be monitored using a tracking signal, which provides an automatically maintained summary of the forecasts produced up to any given time. This can be used to monitor for deteriorating performance of the system.

== See also ==
- Calculating demand forecast accuracy
- Consensus forecast
- Optimism bias
- Demand forecasting
- Exponential growth bias
- Forecast skill
