= Nikaweratiya Divisional Secretariat =

- Divisional Secretariat
- Country: Sri Lanka
- Province: North Western Province
- District: Kurunegala District
- Time zone: UTC+5:30 (Sri Lanka Standard Time)

Nikaweratiya Divisional Secretariat is a Divisional Secretariat of Kurunegala District, of North Western Province, Sri Lanka.

== Demography-Religion ==
Religion in Nikaweratiya DS Division (2012)
1. Buddhist (93.9%)
2. Hindu (0.60%)
3. Muslim (3.70%)
4. Roman Catholic (1.40%)
5. Other Christian (0.40%)
6. Other (0.00%)
