= Egain forecasting =

Egain forecasting is a method of controlling building heating by calculating demand for heating energy that should be supplied to the building in each time unit. By combining physics of structures with meteorology, properties of the building, weather conditions including outdoor temperature, wind speed and direction, as well as solar radiation can be taken into account. In the case of conventional heating control, only current outdoor temperature is considered.

The starting point for developing the method of eGain forecasting was the ENLOSS mathematical energy balance model developed by Prof. Roger Taesler from Swedish Meteorological and Hydrological Institute in cooperation with Thorbjörn Geiser (member of the board) and Stefan Berglund, who are currently both employed at eGain Sweden AB. Forecasting method began to be introduced to use in the late 1980s.

Until 2017 inclusive, forecasting method has been introduced in nearly 16 million square metres of floorage of residential buildings and commercial premises. Estimated data indicate 10 - 15 kWh/m^{2} reduction of average annual heat energy consumption. Since forecasting method contains information about future demand and is not in conflict with other methods of increasing energy efficiency, it is always a good foreground solution.

== eGain Forecasting in practice ==
As far as practical use of this forecasting method is concerned, remote control forecasting receivers are typically used to send and receive data by means of a GPRS or GSM network. The forecasting receivers then manage the operation of control panels installed in the buildings, which adjust the distribution of heat energy in the heating system of a given property.

Recently, special remote control weather loggers have been introduced, and are used in combination with the forecasting receivers. The weather loggers accurately measure air temperature and humidity around the buildings, and these measurements are sent in real time to forecasting receivers. This turning point in technology provides an even more detailed analysis of the building and its environment, and thus improves the possibilities for control via this forecasting method.
