= Product forecasting =

Predicting future product success

Product forecasting is the science of predicting the degree of success a new product will enjoy in the marketplace. To do this, the forecasting model must take into account such things as product awareness, distribution, price, fulfilling unmet needs and competitive alternatives.

== Bass model ==
Bass model is one type of forecasting method primarily used in new product forecasting. In general, there will be no historical demand for new product. Then, Bass model tries to capture shape of demand of existing product and apply new product.

$\frac{f(t)}{1-F(t)} = p + \frac{q}{m} N(t)$

where,

- F(t) is the probability of adoption at time t
- f(t) is the rate at which adoption is changing with respect to t
- N(t) is the number of adopters at time t
- m is the total number of consumers who will eventually adopt
- p is the coefficient of innovation
- q is the coefficient of imitation

Multivariate techniques such as regression can be used to determine the values of p, q and N if historical sales data is available.

== Fourt-Woodlock model ==
The Fourt-Woodlock model is another method used to estimate product sales.

$V = (HH \cdot TR \cdot TU) + (HH\cdot TR\cdot MR \cdot RR \cdot RU)$

The left-hand-side of the equation is the volume of purchases per unit time (usually taken to be one year). On the right-hand-side, the first set of parentheses describe trial volume, and the second describes repeat volume.

HH is the total number of households in the geographic area of projection, and TR ("trial rate") is the percentage of those households which will purchase the product for the first time in a given time period. TU ("trial units") is the number of units purchased on this first purchase occasion. MR is "measured repeat," or the percentage of those who tried the product who will purchase it at least one more time within the first year of the product's launch. RR is the repeats per repeater: the number of repeat purchases within that same year. RU is the number of repeat units purchased on each repeat event.
