= Mean percentage error =

Measure of statistical error

In statistics, the mean percentage error (MPE) is the computed average of percentage errors by which forecasts of a model differ from actual values of the quantity being forecast.

The formula for the mean percentage error is:

$$\text{MPE} = \frac{100\%}{n}\sum_{t=1}^n \frac{f_t-a_t}{a_t}$$

where $a_t$ is the actual value of the quantity being forecast, $f_t$ is the forecast, and $n$ is the number of different times for which the variable is forecast.

Here, the "forecast" could also refer to a measurement (in the case of measurement error) or a model simulation, and "actual" refers to the true or observed value. The interpretation of a positive mean percent error is that the model or forecast has overpredicted the true value. Conversely, a negative sign before the percent error means that the forecast underpredicts the actual value.

Because actual rather than absolute values of the forecast errors are used in the formula, positive and negative forecast errors can offset each other; as a result, the formula can be used as a measure of the bias in the forecasts.

A disadvantage of this measure is that it is undefined whenever a single actual value is zero.

== See also ==
- Percentage error
- Mean absolute percentage error
- Mean squared error
- Mean squared prediction error
- Minimum mean-square error
- Squared deviations
- Peak signal-to-noise ratio
- Root mean square deviation
- Errors and residuals in statistics
