= American decline =

Idea that the United States is diminishing in power

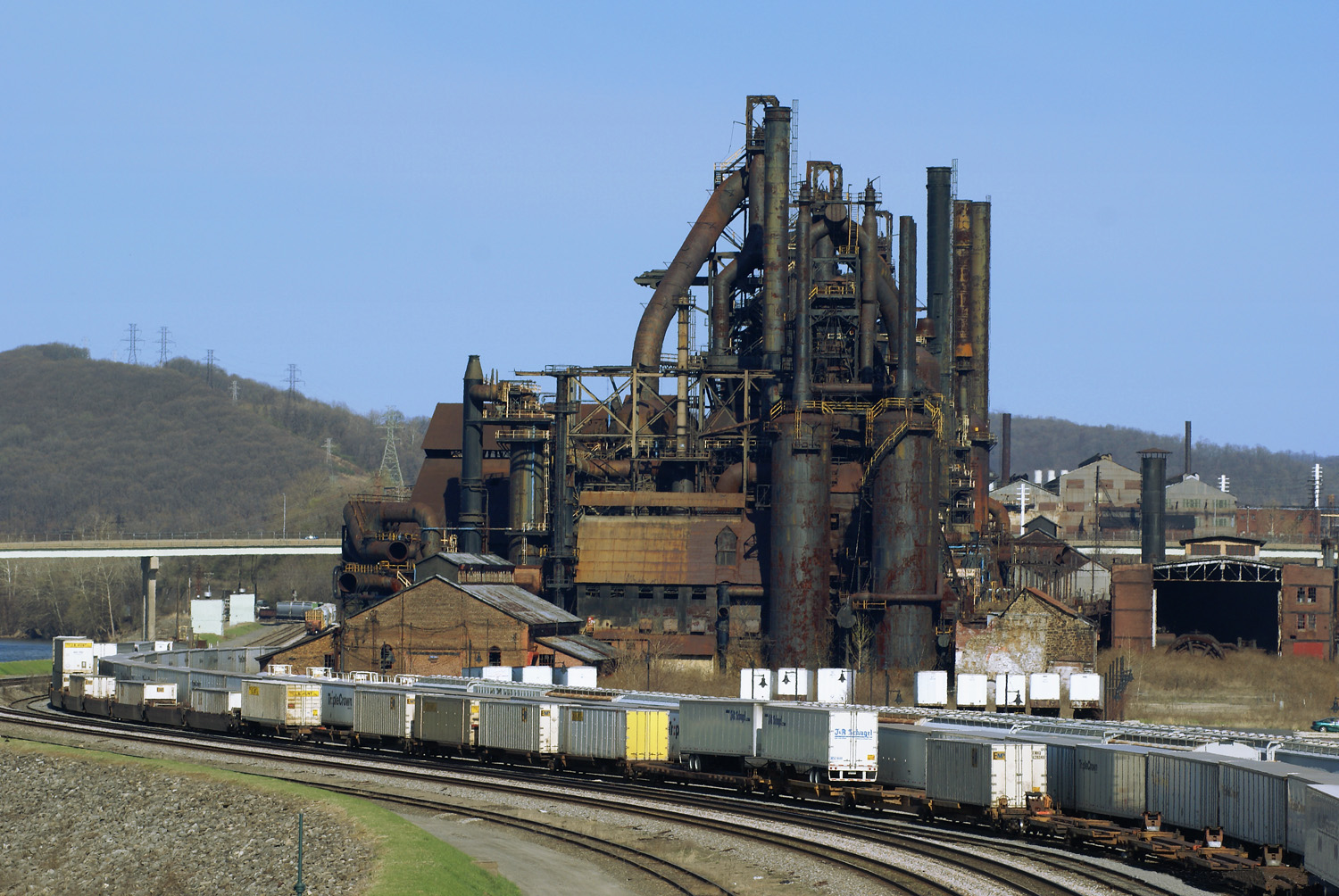
Disused Bethlehem Steel plant in Bethlehem, Pennsylvania. At the height of its success and productivity, the company was a symbol of American manufacturing leadership in the world. The company suspended most of its steelmaking operations in 1982 and declared bankruptcy in 2001; this factory is now part of the Bethlehem Works development site.

American decline is the idea that the United States is diminishing in power on a relative basis geopolitically, militarily, financially, economically, and technologically. It can also refer to absolute declines demographically, socially, morally, spiritually, culturally, in matters of healthcare, and/or on environmental issues. There has been debate over the extent of the decline and whether it is relative or absolute. Empirical research on public opinion has found that responses on metrics such as national pride, faith in government, belief in the "American Dream", and belief in the future of the country, reached their historic lowest in the 2020s-present.

Shrinking military advantages, deficit spending, geopolitical overreach, and a shift in moral, social, and behavioral conditions have been associated with American decline. The ascent of China as a potential superpower emerged as a central concern in discussions about the decline of American influence since the late 2010s, with some scholars suggesting that China has the potential to challenge the United States' current position as the world's leading superpower, though other scholars have criticized this view.

Scholars say that the perception of decline, or declinism, has long been part of American culture. Rhetoric of American decline was prevalent in the 1950s, 1970s and 1980s, as well as during the 2008 financial crisis and the 2020s. However, recent public opinion polls conducted in the 2020s have found that Americans' beliefs in the future of the country have reached their lowest point since public tracking began.

== Assessment ==
According to Jeet Heer, U.S. hegemony has always been supported by three pillars: "economic strength, military might, and the soft power of cultural dominance." According to American diplomat Eric S. Edelman, the declinists, or those who believe America is in decline, have been "consistently wrong" in the past. However, American political scientist Aaron Friedberg cautioned that just because the declinists were wrong in the past does not mean they will be incorrect in their future predictions, and that some of the arguments by the declinists deserve to be taken seriously.

Political scientist Matthew Kroenig argues Washington has "followed the same basic, three-step geopolitical plan since 1945. First, the United States built the current, rules-based international system ... Second, it welcomed into the club any country that played by the rules, even former adversaries ... and third, the U.S. worked with its allies to defend the system from those countries or groups that would challenge it."

Paul Kennedy said in 1987 that America's relative position of power was eroding as the world became multipolar. He quoted Walter Lippman in arguing that American statesmen should manage this decline to smoothly balance the nation's commitments and its actual power, rather than pursuing policies that would give only short-term advantage. The book was published in 1989, three years before the dissolution of the Soviet Union and several years before the bursting of the Japanese asset price bubble, leaving the United States as the sole remaining superpower and the dominant political and economic power internationally. Kennedy argues that great powers often decline due to "imperial overstretch," in which military commitments and deficit spending outpace economic capacity. Writing in 2011, Kennedy applied this framework to the United States after a decade of war, arguing that the focus on military responses to the September 11 attacks distracted the country from addressing unsustainable finances and long-term international engagements.

=== Geopolitical overreach ===
Countries with United States military bases and facilities as of 2026

According to historian Emmanuel Todd, an expansion in military activity and aggression can appear to reflect an increase in capacity while masking a decline in actual power. He observes that this occurred with the Soviet Union in the 1970s, with Russia prior to the War in Ukraine, and with the Roman Empire, and that the United States may be going through a similar period in time.

Chalmers Johnson noted in 2006 that there were 38 large and medium-sized American facilities spread around the globe in 2005 — mostly air and naval bases — approximately the same number as Britain's 36 naval bases and army garrisons at its imperial zenith in 1898.

=== Culture ===
Commentators such as Allan Bloom, E. D. Hirsch, and Russel Jacoby have suggested American culture is in decline. Samuel P. Huntington commented critically on a trend in American culture and politics of predicting constant decline since the late 1950s. As he saw it, declinism came in several distinct waves, namely in reaction to the Soviet Union's launch of Sputnik; to the Vietnam War; to the oil shock of 1973; to Soviet tensions in the late 1970s; and to the general unease that accompanied the end of the Cold War. According to American historian Russell Jacoby, the rise of academic Marxism, radical political economies, and critical literary and cultural studies since World War II has contributed to the decline of American culture.

William J. Bennett argued that America's cultural decline is signaling "a shift in the public's attitudes and beliefs". According to the Index of Leading Cultural Indicators, published in 1993, statistically portraying the moral, social and behavioral conditions of modern American society, often described as 'values', America's cultural condition was in decline with respect to the situations of 30 years ago, 1963. The index showed that there has been an increase in violent crime by more than 6 times, illegitimate births by more than 5 times, the divorce rate by 5 times, the percentage of children living in single-parent homes by four times, and the teenage suicide rate by three times during the 30-year period. However, by 2011, Bennett and others had acknowledged that there had been a marked reduction in the violent crime rate, a reduction of suicide and divorce, as well as improvements in many other social metrics, since 1993. Bennett wrote that contemporary authors see these improving metrics as evidence that the social decline from the 1960s to the early 1990s was temporary, while others (including Bennett) remain sceptical.

According to Kenneth Weisbrode, though some statistics point to American decline (increased death rate, political paralysis, and increased crime), "Americans have had a low culture for a very long time and have long promoted it". He thinks that the obsession with decline is not something new, but something dating back to the Puritans. "Cultural decline, in other words, is as American as apple pie," Weisbrode argues. Weisbrode likens pre-revolutionary France and present-day America for their vulgarity, which he argues is "an almost natural extension or outcome of all that is civilized: a glorification of ego."

David A. Bell argued that the perception of decline is part of the culture. "What the long history of American 'declinism' — as opposed to America's actual possible decline — suggests," says David Bell, "is that these anxieties have an existence of their own that is quite distinct from the actual geopolitical position of our country; that they arise as much from something deeply rooted in the collective psyche of our chattering classes as from sober political and economic analyses."

According to RealClearPolitics, declarations of America's declining power have been common since the beginning of the country. According to British journalist Nick Bryant, "warnings of American decline are by no means new". In the 20th century, declinism came in several distinct waves. In a 2011 book, Thomas L. Friedman and Michael Mandelbaum argued that the United States was in the midst of "its fifth wave of Declinism." The first had come "with the 'Sputnik Shock' of 1957," the second with the Vietnam War, the third with President Jimmy Carter's "malaise" and the rise of Japan, and the fourth with the increased power of China. According to Robert Lieber in 2021, “declinists’ proclamations about America have appeared ever since America's founding" and "it can be instructive to compare current arguments and prescriptions of the new declinism with the ideas of earlier eras."

=== Political polarization ===
David Leonhardt writes that "incomes, wealth, and life expectancy in the United States have stagnated for much of the population, contributing to an angry national mood and exacerbating political divisions. The result is a semidysfunctional government that is eroding many of the country’s largest advantages over China." Jonathan Hopkin writes that decades of neoliberal policies, which made the United States "the most extreme case of the subjection of society to the brute force of the market," resulted in unprecedented levels of inequality, and combined with an unstable financial system and limited political choices, paved the way for political instability and revolt, as evidenced by the resurgence of the Left as represented by the Bernie Sanders 2016 presidential campaign and the rise of an "unlikely figure" like Donald Trump to the presidency of the United States.

In 2021, Michael McFaul, former U.S. Ambassador to Russia from 2012 to 2014, stated his belief that the U.S. has faced a democratic decline, stemming from elite polarization and damage done by former president Donald Trump to trust in elections and bonds with democratic allies. McFaul states that the decline in democracy weakens national security and heavily restrains foreign policy.

According to Michael Beckley, the domestic dysfunction in the United States has not meaningfully altered its power in the world. He writes, "This is the paradox of American power: the United States is a divided country, perpetually perceived as in decline, yet it consistently remains the wealthiest and most powerful state in the world — leaving competitors behind."

=== Economy ===
Largest economies in the world by GDP (nominal) in 2022
according to International Monetary Fund estimates

Economist Jeffrey Sachs observed the US share of world income was 24.6% in 1980, falling to 19.1% in 2011. The ratio of average CEO earnings to average workers’ pay in the U.S. went from 24:1 in 1965 to 262:1 in 2005. The Census Bureau's record of income inequality reached its highest point in 2018.

Some centrists believe that the American fiscal crisis stems from the rising expenditures on social programs or, alternatively, from the increases in military spending for the Iraq and Afghanistan wars, both of which would lead to decline. However, Richard Lachmann argues that if military or overall spending is not pressuring the U.S. economy, they would not contribute to U.S. decline. Lachmann describes the real problem as "the misallocation of government revenue and expenditure, resulting in resources being diverted from the tasks vital to maintain economic or geopolitical dominance." Kennedy argues that as military expenses grow, this reduces investments in economic growth, which eventually "leads to the downward spiral of slower growth, heavier taxes, deepening domestic splits over spending priorities, and weakening capacity to bear the burdens of defense."

=== Health ===
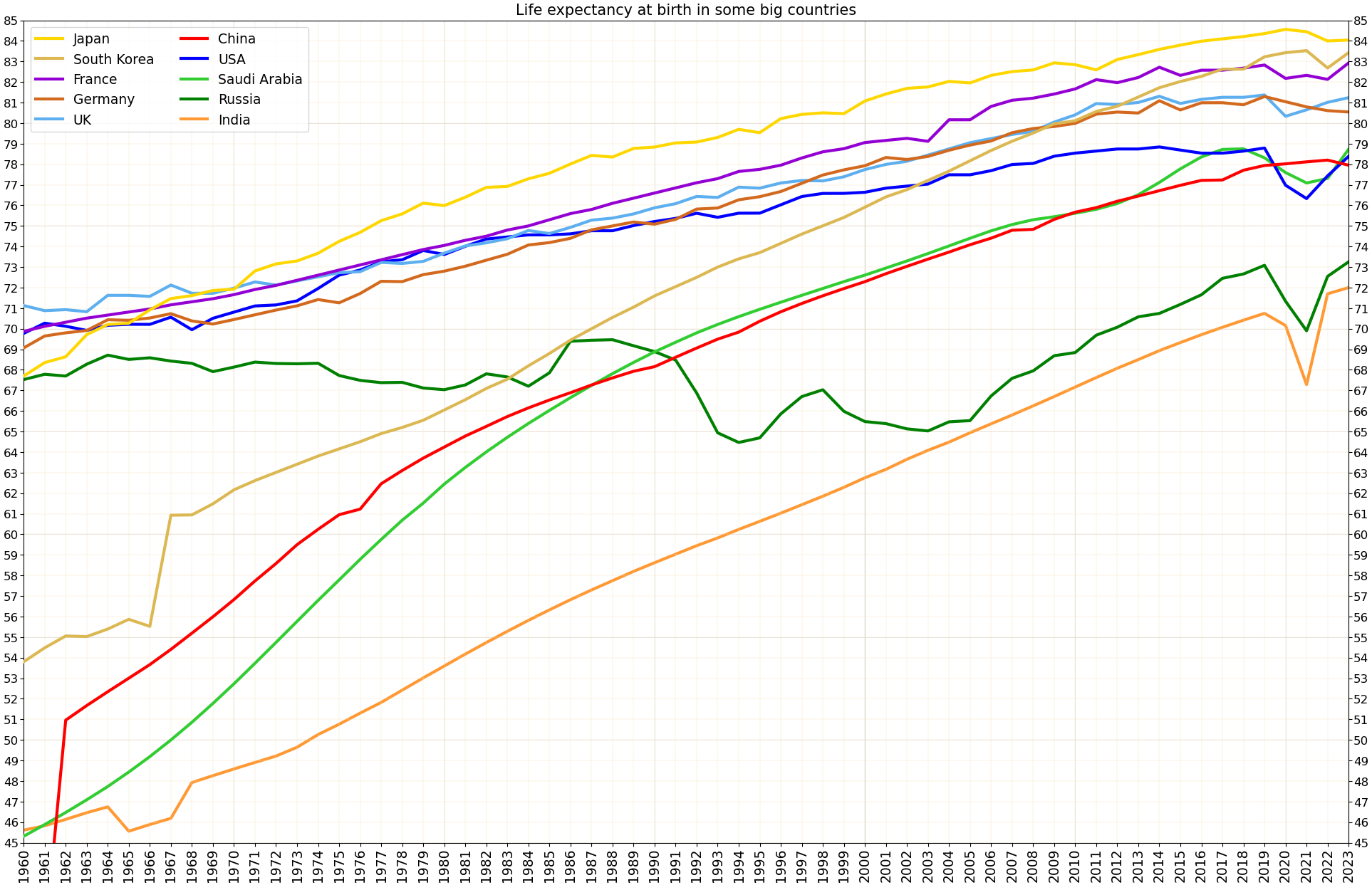
Life expectancy at birth in several large countries; the US (dark blue) can be seen to fall behind other wealthy nations from the 1980s onward, and life expectancy has decreased since the COVID-19 pandemic.

The economists Anne Case and Angus Deaton attribute rising mortality, which is mostly impacting the working class, to the flaws in contemporary capitalism.

Since the 1980s, life expectancy has fallen behind that of peer countries, with increasing mortality among working age Americans being a major reason. According to a 2025 study, there were 14.5 million excess deaths in the United States between 1980 and 2023, relative to mortality rates in other HICs.

=== Competition with China ===
GDP (current US$) - United States, China (in trillions of US$, 1960–2019)

GDP per capita - United States, China (1960–2019)

China challenging the United States for global dominance constitutes a core issue in the debate over the American decline.

According to former Australian prime minister Kevin Rudd, "China has multiple domestic vulnerabilities that are rarely noted in the media. The United States, on the other hand, always has its weaknesses on full public display but has repeatedly demonstrated its capacity for reinvention and restoration." Ryan Hass of the Brookings Institution said that much of the narrative of China "inexorably rising and on the verge of overtaking a faltering United States" was promoted by China's state-affiliated media outlets. Hass went on to say, "Authoritarian systems excel at showcasing their strengths and concealing their weaknesses. But policymakers in Washington must be able to distinguish between the image Beijing presents and the realities it confronts."

Nicholas Eberstadt, an economist and demographic expert at the American Enterprise Institute, said in 2019, that current demographic trends will overwhelm China's economy and geopolitics, making its rise much more uncertain. He said, "The age of heroic economic growth is over."

Michael Beckley has challenged notions that China is an equal geopolitically to the United States, writing "The American sphere now stands alone. China and Russia cannot consolidate control over their own regions, much less project sustained power into the United States’ backyard. They can intimidate neighbors and sow disruption, but their influence quickly runs into resistance and chokepoints. The result is not multipolarity but stark asymmetry: one consolidated American sphere and contested space everywhere else."

=== 2026 Iran war ===
Multiple analyses have argued that the US-Israeli war on Iran in 2026 is a cause, or a sign of, the American decline, being described by the historian Alfred W. McCoy as another "micro-military disaster" that accelerated the destruction of successive empires over the past 2,500 years.

The Conversation listed several reasons for why the United States has been in a weakened position, namely loss of influence in the Middle East, limiting its geopolitical involvement in other regions, the massive economic crisis from the 2026 Strait of Hormuz crisis, and the rupture of the world order leading to loss of American global power.

== Comparisons with earlier states ==
Since the mid-20th century, imperial decline and fall is the most popular theme in imperiology and the only widely accepted case of historical inevitability. Robert Conquest explains the phenomenon psychologically: "This is usually a set of false parallels designed to show that America is inevitably heading for a fall."

Samuel P. Huntington noticed that predictions of American decline have been part of American politics since the late 1950s. According to Daniel Bell, "many of America's leading commentators have had a powerful impulse consistently to see the United States as a weak, 'bred out' basket case that will fall to stronger rivals as inevitably as Rome fell to the barbarians or France to Henry V at Agincourt." Huntington critiqued declinism as misguided but praised it on some counts: "Declinism has predicted the imminent shrinkage of American power. In all its phases, that prediction has become central to preventing that shrinkage."

Political scientist Paul K. Macdonald writes that great powers can be in relative or absolute decline and discussed the ways they often respond. The most common is retrenchment (reducing some but not all commitments of the state).

=== Roman Empire ===
Certain commentators, historians, and politicians believe the U.S. is heir to the Roman Empire. According to Kristofer Allerfeldt, there are divergent views regarding Rome vs. U.S. comparison. He believes that the "use of the Roman metaphor provides a scholarly patina to the expression of visceral hopes and fears."

=== Britain ===
Kennedy argues that "British financial strength was the single most decisive factor in its victories over France during the 18th century. This chapter ends on the Napoleonic Wars and the fusion of British financial strength with a newfound industrial strength." He predicts that, as the U.S. dollar loses its role as world currency, it will not be able to continue financing its military expenditures via deficit spending.

According to Richard Lachmann, the U.S. would last much longer if, like Britain, it could restrict particular families and elites from exclusively controlling offices and governmental powers.

=== Soviet Union ===
Historian Harold James published an article in 2020 titled "Late Soviet America", comparing the present-day United States to the former Soviet Union. James wrote that many aspects of the US now resemble the late Soviet Union: intensification of social conflict, ethnic/racial rivalries, and economic decline. He predicted that the dollar may lose its value and start looking like the Soviet rouble. James ended the article by saying that the economic decline will continue even if there is a change in leadership, pointing to Mikhail Gorbachev's inability to prevent collapse despite coming to power just a few years after Leonid Brezhnev's death.

Also in 2020, political commentator Julius Krein argued that the decline of the United States parallels the late Soviet Union vis-à-vis the "unmistakable" slide into gerontocracy.

== Commentators ==
- Columnist Charles Krauthammer: "If the Roman empire had declined at this rate, you'd be reading this column in Latin."
- Philosophers Michael Hardt and Antonio Negri theorize in the mid-1990s about an ongoing transition to an emergent construct created among ruling powers, which the authors call "Empire".
- American historian Morris Berman wrote a trilogy of books published between 2000 and 2011 about the decline of American civilization.
- Igor Panarin, a political scientist and graduate of the Higher Military Command School of Telecommunications of the KGB, predicted that, starting in 1998, the US would collapse into six parts in 2010. He also wrote The Crash of the Dollar and the Disintegration of the USA (2009).
- Historian Max Ostrovsky observed that many pundits and academic writers decline, decrease, decompose, break-up the United States, proclaim its dominance unrealistic, or turn its Century over. "Despite all these efforts, the United States prevails."
- American journalist Chris Hedges, in his 2018 book America, The Farewell Tour, predicts that "within a decade, two at most," America will cease to be the dominant super-power in the world.
- Political scientist Marie Gottschalk of the University of Pennsylvania argues in Crime and No Punishment: Wealth, Power, and Violence in America (2025) that lack of corporate accountability and the increased concentration of economic, military and political power is draining communities of much needed resources, which is undermining the legitimacy of economic and political institutions, fostering political instability and paving the way for the country to descend into a failed state.
- Jean Chrétien, prime minister of Canada from 1993 until 2003, described Trump's election as a "monumental error" that heralded "the true end of the American empire" in a 2018 memoir.
- Xi Jinping, the general secretary of the Chinese Communist Party since 2012, said in an October 2020 speech that "the East is rising and the West is declining". He said the "biggest source of chaos in the present-day world is the United States". However, Xi also warned that despite China's rise, there were still many ways where "the West is strong and the East is weak".

== Public opinion ==
A 2019 survey carried out by Pew Research Center shows that a majority of Americans predicted the U.S. economy to be weaker in 2050. The survey also found that a majority of the people thought the U.S. would be "a country with a burgeoning national debt, a wider gap between the rich and the poor and a workforce threatened by automation."

In a poll conducted January 11–13, 2021, of 1,019 Americans, shortly after the January 6 Capitol attack, 79% of those surveyed said that America is "falling apart".

According to a September 2025 WSJ-NORC poll, the percentage of US citizens who believe that hard work leads to economic gain fell to 25%, a record low in initial surveys dating back to 1987. Additionally, it was found that nearly 70% of people said they believe the American dream no longer held true or never did, the highest level in nearly 15 years of surveys.

According to a March 2026 Pew Research Center poll, 41% of Americans think the US is getting weaker, 34% believe it is getting stronger, while 24% think its power is staying the same. 57% of Americans consider the US to be a superpower, and 44% consider China to be a superpower.

A June 2026 Reuters/Ipsos poll found that 38% of Americans doubted that the nation will exist as a single country another 250 years from now. About two-thirds of respondents, including 85% of Democrats and 50% of Republicans, believe that American democracy is in danger of failing, an increase from 57% in August of 2025. 77% of respondents believe political violence will likely increase over the next five years, and 30% consider America the greatest country in the world, down from 38% in November 2017.

A PBS News/NPR/Marist poll conducted in July 2026 found that a vast majority of Americans (83%) believe the country has strayed from its founding principles. Nearly half (47%) say it has moved "far away," an increase from 30% when the same question was asked ahead of the 1976 bicentennial. 82% of Americans believe the future of democracy faces a serious threat, up from 78% earlier in the year. The poll also found that 37% of adults now believe Americans may need to resort to violence to get the country back on track, an increase from 30% in October of 2025. Historian Beverly Gage says that "What makes the current moment distinct, is the 'seeming popularity or resignation to the idea that violence might become necessary.' There's also the 'widespread nature of gun ownership and the ways that violence can be turned into mass violence much more easily than it could in the past.'"

== See also ==
- 2008 financial crisis – Worldwide economic crisis
- After the Empire by Emmanuel Todd
- American Century – Term for American geopolitical dominance
- Civil War – A 2024 action war film
- Decadence – Perceived decay of standards in a society
- Democratic backsliding in the United States
- Foundation series by Isaac Asimov
- Historic recurrence – Repetition of similar events in history
- Idiocracy – A 2006 science fiction comedy film
- Managed decline – Business management at the end of a lifecycle
- Political violence in the United States
- Pax Americana – Historical concept
- Post-Western era – Conjectured era without Western dominance
- Rosy retrospection – Disproportionate favor towards the past
- Rust Belt – Region in the U.S. affected by industrial decline
- Sick man of Europe – Geopolitical designation
- Societal collapse – Fall of a complex human society
- State collapse – Catastrophic government dissolution
- The Decline of the West by Oswald Spengler
- The East is rising and the West is declining – A term in Chinese political rhetoric
