= Predictions of the collapse of the Soviet Union =

During the 20th century, several individuals and organizations made predictions that the Soviet Union would cease to exist as a sovereign state at some point in the near future. Although the dissolution of the Soviet Union took place between 1988 and 1991, and the USSR ceased to exist due to the departure of all 15 Union Republics as independent sovereign states, there is debate on whether any particular prediction was correct—as they give different reasons, series of events, and predicted timelines for the dissolution.

Authors often considered to have predicted an end of the Soviet Union include Soviet revolutionary Leon Trotsky in The Revolution Betrayed: What Is the Soviet Union and Where Is It Going? (1936), Soviet dissident Andrei Amalrik in Will the Soviet Union Survive Until 1984? (1970), French academic Emmanuel Todd in La chute finale: Essais sur la décomposition de la sphère soviétique (1976), Indian-American economist Ravi Batra in The Downfall of Capitalism and Communism (1978), and French historian Hélène Carrère d'Encausse. Additionally, American historian Walter Laqueur notes that "Various articles that appeared in professional journals such as Problems of Communism and Survey dealt with the decay and the possible downfall of the Soviet regime." Some Americans, particularly conservatives, view the Strategic Defense Initiative of the Reagan administration as not only predicting, but causing the dissolution of the Soviet state.

== Conventional wisdom discounting a collapse ==
=== U.S. analysts ===
Predictions of the Soviet Union's impending demise were discounted by many Western academic specialists, and had little impact on mainstream Sovietology. For example, Amalrik's book "was welcomed as a piece of brilliant literature in the West" but "virtually no one tended to take it at face value as a piece of political prediction." Up to about 1980, the strength of the Soviet Union was widely overrated by critics and revisionists alike.

In 1983, Princeton University professor Stephen Cohen described the Soviet system as remarkably stable.

The Central Intelligence Agency also over-estimated the internal stability of the Soviet Union, and did not anticipate its rapid dissolution. Former Director of Central Intelligence Stansfield Turner in 1991 wrote in the US Journal Foreign Affairs, "We should not gloss over the enormity of this failure to forecast the magnitude of the Soviet crisis . . . Yet I never heard a suggestion from the CIA, or the intelligence arms of the departments of Defense or State, that numerous Soviets recognized a growing, systemic economic problem."

In a symposium launched in 1967 to review Michel Garder's French book: L'Agonie du Regime en Russie Sovietique (The Death Struggle of the Regime in Soviet Russia), which predicted a collapse of the USSR, Yale Professor Frederick C. Barghoorn dismissed Garder's book as "the latest in a long line of apocalyptic predictions of the collapse of communism." He warns that "great revolutions are most infrequent and that successful political systems are tenacious and adaptive." In addition, the reviewer of the book, Michael Tatu, disapproved of the "apocalyptic character" of such a forecast and is almost apologetic for treating it seriously.

== Predictions of dissolution or collapse ==
Analysts, organizations and politicians who predicted that the Soviet Union would one day cease to exist included:

=== Ludwig von Mises ===
The Austrian economist Ludwig von Mises argued in his 1922 book Socialism: An Economic and Sociological Analysis that the Soviet system would eventually cease to exist. This book was written during the period of war communism in early Soviet Russia and analyzes that system. Mises' analysis was based on the economic calculation problem, a critique of central planning first outlined in 1920 journal articles. His argument was that the Soviet Union would find itself increasingly unable to set correct prices for the goods and services it produced:

We may admit that in its initial period a socialist regime could to some extent rely on the preceding age of capitalism [for the purpose of determining prices]. But what is to be done later, as conditions change more and more? Of what use could the prices of 1900 be for the director in 1949? And what use can the director in 1989 derive from knowledge of the prices of 1949?

=== Vladimir Lenin ===
Vladimir Lenin, who firmly believed that an international revolution was coming after the October Revolution, said in the 7th Congress of the Russian Communist Party (Bolsheviks):

You wanted the revolution to reckon with you. But history has taught you a lesson. It is a lesson, because it is the absolute truth that without a German revolution we are doomed—perhaps not in Petrograd, not in Moscow, but in Vladivostok, in more remote places to which perhaps we shall have to retreat, and the distance to which is perhaps greater than the distance from Petrograd to Moscow. At all events, under all conceivable circumstances, if the German revolution does not come, we are doomed.

Although this was said before the German Revolution, it still shows the attitude Lenin could have had after the failure of the German Revolution.

=== Leon Trotsky ===
One of the founders of the USSR, later expelled by Joseph Stalin, Leon Trotsky devoted much of his time in exile to the question of the Soviet Union's future. In time, he came to believe that a new revolution was necessary to depose the nomenklatura and reinstate working class rule as the first step to socialism. In 1936 he made the following prediction:

In order better to understand the character of the present Soviet Union, let us make two different hypotheses about its future. Let us assume first that the Soviet bureaucracy is overthrown by a revolutionary party having all the attributes of the old Bolshevism, enriched moreover by the world experience of the recent period. Such a party would begin with the restoration of democracy in the trade unions and the Soviets. It would be able to, and would have to, restore freedom of Soviet parties. Together with the masses, and at their head, it would carry out a ruthless purgation of the state apparatus. It would abolish ranks and decorations, all kinds of privileges, and would limit inequality in the payment of labor to the life necessities of the economy and the state apparatus. It would give the youth free opportunity to think independently, learn, criticize and grow. It would introduce profound changes in the distribution of the national income in correspondence with the interests and will of the worker and peasant masses. But so far as concerns property relations, the new power would not have to resort to revolutionary measures. It would retain and further develop the experiment of planned economy. After the political revolution—that is, the deposing of the bureaucracy—the proletariat would have to introduce in the economy a series of very important reforms, but not another social revolution.

If—to adopt a second hypothesis—a bourgeois party were to overthrow the ruling Soviet caste, it would find no small number of ready servants among the present bureaucrats, administrators, technicians, directors, party secretaries and privileged upper circles in general. A purgation of the state apparatus would, of course, be necessary in this case too. But a bourgeois restoration would probably have to clean out fewer people than a revolutionary party. The chief task of the new power would be to restore private property in the means of production. First of all, it would be necessary to create conditions for the development of strong farmers from the weak collective farms, and for converting the strong collectives into producers' cooperatives of the bourgeois type into agricultural stock companies. In the sphere of industry, denationalization would begin with the light industries and those producing food. The planning principle would be converted for the transitional period into a series of compromises between state power and individual "corporations"—potential proprietors, that is, among the Soviet captains of industry, the émigré former proprietors and foreign capitalists. Notwithstanding that the Soviet bureaucracy has gone far toward preparing a bourgeois restoration, the new regime would have to introduce in the matter of forms of property and methods of industry not a reform, but a social revolution.

Let us assume to take a third variant – that neither a revolutionary nor a counterrevolutionary party seizes power. The bureaucracy continues at the head of the state. Even under these conditions social relations will not jell. We cannot count upon the bureaucracy's peacefully and voluntarily renouncing itself in behalf of socialist equality. If at the present time, notwithstanding the too obvious inconveniences of such an operation, it has considered it possible to introduce ranks and decorations, it must inevitably in future stages seek supports for itself in property relations. One may argue that the big bureaucrat cares little what are the prevailing forms of property, provided only they guarantee him the necessary income. This argument ignores not only the instability of the bureaucrat's own rights, but also the question of his descendants. The new cult of the family has not fallen out of the clouds. Privileges have only half their worth, if they cannot be transmitted to one's children. But the right of testament is inseparable from the right of property. It is not enough to be the director of a trust; it is necessary to be a stockholder. The victory of the bureaucracy in this decisive sphere would mean its conversion into a new possessing class. On the other hand, the victory of the proletariat over the bureaucracy would insure a revival of the socialist revolution. The third variant consequently brings us back to the two first, with which, in the interests of clarity and simplicity, we set out.

=== World War II ===
In 1941 Adolf Hitler of Nazi Germany decided to attack the Soviet Union (Operation Barbarossa). In June 1941 the German Wehrmacht and other Axis military forces invaded the Soviet Union, and the Red Army retreated. Hitler predicted, "we have only to kick in the door and the whole rotten structure will come crashing down".

Military observers around the world watched closely. It appears that most of them shared Hitler's opinion, expecting that Germany would win, destroy the Soviet system, and establish a Nazi New Order in Europe. Very few American experts thought the Soviet Union would survive. The German invasion began on 22 June 1941. Subsequently, the United States Department of War advised Franklin D. Roosevelt that the German army would conquer the Soviet Union within one to three months. In July 1941 the American general staff issued memoranda to the American press that a Soviet collapse was to be expected within several weeks. British analysts held similar views, believing that Germany would win within three to six weeks without heavy losses.

Predictions of an expected Soviet defeat had an important impact on President Roosevelt; while the United States was not at the time at war, Roosevelt favored the Allies (represented primarily at that time by the British Empire and the Soviet Union), and decided to try to avert the collapse of the USSR by extending to the Soviets (October 1941) the supply of munitions through Lend-Lease (which had started in March 1941), and also to pressure Japan not to attack while the USSR was so vulnerable. The Red Army held the line at the outskirts of Moscow (December 1941) and predictions of Soviet collapse changed to "uncertain".

=== Early Cold War ===
==== George Orwell ====
George Orwell, author of Animal Farm and Nineteen Eighty-Four, wrote in 1946 that "the Russian regime will either democratize itself or it will perish". He was regarded by US historian Robert Conquest as one of the first people who made such a prediction. According to a Conquest article published in 1969, "In time, the Communist world is faced with a fundamental crisis. We can not say for certain that it will democratize itself. But every indication is that it will, as Orwell said, either democratize itself or perish...We must also, though, be prepared to cope with cataclysmic changes, for the death throes of the more backward apparatus may be destructive and dangerous".

==== George Kennan ====
American diplomat George F. Kennan proposed his famous containment theory in 1946–47, arguing that, if the Soviet Union were not allowed to expand, it would soon collapse. In the X Article he wrote:

[T]he main element of any United States policy toward the Soviet Union must be a long-term, patient but firm and vigilant containment of Russian expansive tendencies... Soviet pressure against the free institutions of the Western world is something that can be constrained by the adroit and vigilant application of counter-force at a series of constantly shifting geographical and political points, corresponding to the shifts and manoeuvres of Soviet policy.

The United States would have to undertake this containment alone and unilaterally, but if it could do so without undermining its own economic health and political stability, the Soviet party structure would undergo a period of immense strain eventually resulting in "either the break-up or the gradual mellowing of Soviet power."

Kennan later regretted the manner in which his theory was received and implemented, but it nevertheless became a core element of American strategy, which consisted of building a series of military alliances around the USSR.

==== Winston Churchill ====
Winston Churchill made repeated claims about the imminent fall of the Soviet Union throughout his political career. In January 1920, he denounced Bolshevism as a "rule of men who in their insane vanity and conceit believe they are entitled to give a government to a people which the people loathe and detest... The attempt to carry into practice those wild theories can only be attended with universal confusion, corruption, disorder and civil war." Later, he made a similar prediction in a journal article in 1931. After World War II, speaking about the recently established Soviet satellite states in Eastern Europe, he stated in 1954: "The forces of the human spirit and of national character alive in those countries cannot be speedily extinguished even by large-scale movements of populations and mass education of children." And in the epilogue to the one volume edition of his World War II memoirs, published in 1957, Churchill wrote: "The natural forces are working with greater freedom and greater opportunity to fertilize and vary the thoughts and the power of individual men and women. They are far bigger and more pliant in the vast structure of a mighty empire than could ever have been conceived by Marx in his hovel... Human society will grow in many forms not comprehended by a party machine."

==== Zbigniew Brzezinski ====
Zbigniew Brzezinski, National Security Advisor to US President Jimmy Carter, predicted the dissolution of the Soviet Union on several occasions. In a 2006 interview, Brzezinski stated that in his 1950 master's thesis (which has not been published) he argued that "the Soviet Union was pretending to be a single state but in fact it was a multinational empire in the age of nationalism. So the Soviet Union would break up."

As an academic at Columbia University, Brzezinski wrote numerous books and articles that "took seriously the option of collapse", including Dilemmas of Change in Soviet Politics (1969) and Between Two Ages: America's Role in the Technetronic Era (1970).

Dilemmas of Change in Soviet Politics contained fourteen articles dealing with the future of the Soviet Union. Six of them, by Brzezinski himself, Robert Conquest, Merle Fainsod, Eugene Lyons, Giorgio Galli, and Isaac Don Levine, considered "collapse as a serious possibility although not immediately."

On the other hand, in 1976 Brzezinski predicted that the politics of the Soviet Union would be practically unchanged for several more generations to come:

A central question, however, is whether such social change [modernization] is capable of altering, or has in fact already altered in a significant fashion, the underlying character of Soviet politics. That character, as I have argued, has been shaped largely by political traditions derived from the specifics of Russian / Soviet history, and it is deeply embedded in the operational style and institutions of the existing Soviet system. The ability of that system to resist de-Stalinization seems to indicate a considerable degree of resilience on the part of the dominant mode of politics in the Soviet context. It suggests, at the very least, that political changes are produced very slowly through social change, and that one must wait for at least several generations before social change begins to be significantly reflected in the political sphere.

In 1989, shortly before the fall of the Berlin Wall and the collapse of Soviet power throughout Eastern Europe, Brzezinski published The Grand Failure: The Birth and Decay of Communism in the Twentieth Century. In that work he wrote:

Marxist-Leninism is an alien doctrine imposed on the region by an imperial power whose rule is culturally repugnant to the dominated peoples. As a result, a process of organic rejection of communism by Eastern European societies—a phenomenon similar to the human body's rejection of a transplanted organ—is underway."

Brzezinski went on to claim that communism "failed to take into account the basic human craving for individual freedom." He argued there were five possibilities for USSR:

1. Successful pluralization,
2. Protracted crisis,
3. Renewed stagnation,
4. Coup (KGB, Military), and
5. The explicit collapse of the Communist regime.

Option #5 in fact took place three years later, but at the time he wrote that collapse was "at this stage a much more remote possibility" than alternative #3: renewed stagnation. He also predicted the chance of some form of communism existing in the Soviet Union in 2017 was a little more than 50 percent. Finally, when the end did come in a few more decades, Brzezinski wrote, it would be "most likely turbulent."

==== Ferenc Farkas de Kisbarnak ====
Ferenc Farkas de Kisbarnak, an exiled Hungarian general and leader of the Anti-Bolshevik Bloc of Nations (ABN), predicted the dissolution of the Soviet Union due to nationalist pressures. From 12–14 June 1950, the Convention of the ABN was held in Edinburgh, Scotland under the auspices of the Scottish League for European Freedom. At the conference, Farkas gave a speech entitled "The War Against Bolshevism and the Military Factors Represented by the Subjugated Nations" where he predicted the disintegration of the USSR along ethnic lines which would eventually leave European Russia isolated. He predicted the eventual independence of Ukraine, the Baltic states, Turkestan, the Idel-Ural republics, and Siberia. The third resolution of the ABN convention further called for "The destruction of Russian imperialism and the guarantee of world peace by splitting the USSR up and re-establishing on ethnic principles, the independent national states of all nations living under bolshevist oppression bearing among other things, in mind that whole national groups have been forcible [sic] deported and are awaiting the moment when they could return to their native land."

==== Mao Zedong ====
In October 1957, the Soviet Union launched the first artificial satellite in human history. However, Mao Zedong, the Chairman of the CCP, made a deeply worried comment: "The satellite goes up, and the red flag falls to the ground." Mao believed that because the Soviet Union had taken the revisionist path under the leadership of Khrushchev, the occurrence of dissolution or extinction was highly possible.

==== Charles de Gaulle ====
Only a handful of thinkers, ranging from French President Charles de Gaulle to the Soviet dissident Andrei Amalrik, foretold the eventual dissolution of the Soviet Union itself, and even they saw it as likely to happen as a result of disastrous wars with China or pressures from the Islamic Soviet states of Central Asia.

On 23 November 1959, in a speech in Strasbourg, de Gaulle announced his vision for Europe: Oui, c'est l'Europe, depuis l'Atlantique jusqu'à l'Oural, c'est toute l'Europe, qui décidera du destin du monde. ("Yes, it is Europe, from the Atlantic to the Urals, it is Europe, it is the whole of Europe, that will decide the destiny of the world.") This phrase has been interpreted in various ways—on the one hand, as offering détente to the USSR, on the other, as predicting the collapse of communism throughout Eastern Europe.

==== Konrad Adenauer ====
Konrad Adenauer has been cited predicting the reunification of Germany as early as the 1950s, but according to Hans-Peter Schwarz, in the last few years of Adenauer's life he repeatedly said that Soviet power would last a long time.

In 1966, at the Christian Democrats' party conference, Adenauer stated his hopes that some day the Soviets might allow the reunification of Germany. Some analysts say it might be considered a prediction:

I have not given up hope. One day Soviet Russia will recognize that the division of Germany, and with it the division of Europe, is not to its advantage. We must be watchful for when the moment comes... we must not let it go unexploited.

==== Whittaker Chambers ====
In a posthumously published 1964 book entitled Cold Friday, Communist defector Whittaker Chambers predicted an eventual Soviet collapse beginning with a "satellite revolution" in Eastern Europe. This revolution would then result in the transformation of the Soviet dictatorship.

==== Robert A. Mundell ====
In the late 1960s, economist Robert A. Mundell predicted the collapse of the USSR.

==== Michel Garder ====
Michel Garder was a French author who predicted the dissolution of the Soviet Union in the book L'Agonie du Regime en Russie Sovietique (The Death Struggle of the Regime in Soviet Russia) (1965). He set the date of the collapse for 1970.

=== Détente ===
==== RAND corporation ====
In 1968 Egon Neuberger, of the RAND Corporation, predicted that "[t]he centrally planned economy eventually would meet its demise, because of its demonstrably growing ineffectiveness as a system for managing a modernizing economy in a rapidly changing world."

==== Sun Myung Moon ====
Sun Myung Moon, founder of the Unification Church repeatedly predicted that Communism was inherently flawed and would inevitably collapse sometime in the late 1980s. In a speech to followers in Paris in April 1972, he stated:

"Communism, begun in 1917, could maintain itself approximately 60 years and reach its peak. So 1978 is the borderline and afterward communism will decline; in the 70th year it will be altogether ruined. This is true. Therefore now is the time for people who are studying communism to abandon it."

==== Andrei Amalrik ====
In 1969, prominent dissident Andrei Amalrik wrote in his book Will the Soviet Union Survive Until 1984?:

There is another powerful factor which works against the chance of any kind of peaceful reconstruction and which is equally negative for all levels of society: this is the extreme isolation in which the regime has placed both society and itself. This isolation has not only separated the regime from society, and all sectors of society from each other, but also put the country in extreme isolation from the rest of the world. This isolation has created for all—from the bureaucratic elite to the lowest social levels—an almost surrealistic picture of the world and of their place in it. Yet the longer this state of affairs helps to perpetuate the status quo, the more rapid and decisive will be its collapse when confrontation with reality becomes inevitable.

Amalrik predicted the collapse of the regime would occur between 1980 and 1985. The year in the title was after the novel of the same name.

Soviet authorities were skeptical. Natan Sharansky explained that "in 1984 KGB officials, on coming to me in prison" when Amalrik's prediction was mentioned, "laughed at this prediction. Amalrik is long dead, they said, but we are still very much present."

==== Marian Kamil Dziewanowski ====
Historian Marian Kamil Dziewanowski "gave a lecture titled 'Death of the Soviet Regime' at the Russian Research Center at Harvard University. The same lecture was delivered at Cambridge University in England in 1971 and 1979. The text of the lecture (titled 'Death of the Soviet Regime: a Study in American Sovietology, by a Historian') was published in Studies in Soviet Thought. In 1980, he "updated this study and delivered it as a paper at the International Slavic Congress at Garmisch; titled 'The Future of Soviet Russia,' it was published in Coexistence: An International Journal (Glasgow 1982)."

==== Emmanuel Todd ====
French academic Emmanuel Todd attracted attention in 1976 when he predicted the fall of the Soviet Union, based on indicators such as increasing infant mortality rates and foreign trade data in his work La chute finale: Essais sur la décomposition de la sphère Soviétique (The Final Fall: an Essay on the Disintegration of the Soviet Sphere). Todd deduced that the Soviet Union had stagnated in the 1970s and was falling behind not only the West but its own Eastern European satellite states economically. In addition to this, low birth rates, a rising suicide rate, and worker discontent all were factors in an increasingly low level of productivity in the economy. Todd also predicted that poorly carried-out political and economic reforms would lead to a break-up of the Soviet Union with non-Russian republics seceding.

==== Bernard Levin ====
Bernard Levin drew attention in 1992 to his prophetic article originally published in The Times in September 1977, in which an uncannily accurate prediction of the appearance of new faces in the Politburo was made, resulting in radical but peaceful political change.

==== Daniel Patrick Moynihan ====
U.S. Senator Daniel Patrick Moynihan in a series of articles and interviews from 1975 onward discussed the possibility, indeed likelihood, of the breakup of the Soviet Empire. But Moynihan also expressed the view that liberal democracy, too, faced an uncertain future. He argued in January 1975 that the Soviet Union was so weak economically, and so divided ethnically, that it could not long survive. However he said it "might have considerable time left before ethnicity breaks it up." By 1984 he argued "the Soviet idea is spent. History is moving away from it at astounding speed." Some of his essays were published as Secrecy: The American Experience in 1999.

==== Hélène Carrère d'Encausse ====
In her 1978 book L'Empire éclaté, historian (and later member of the Académie française and the European Parliament) Hélène Carrère d'Encausse predicted that the Soviet Union's political legitimacy would be fatally strained by diverging fertility between its culturally Russian/Eastern European parts (dominant in government and industry but with plummeting birth rates) and its culturally Asian and/or Muslim parts (with growing birth rates but little representation in the established "gerontocracy"). L'Empire éclaté generated substantial media interest at the time, winning the 1978 Prix Aujourd′hui.

==== Samizdat ====
Various essays published in samizdat in the early 1970s were on similar lines, some quite specifically predicting the end of the Soviet Union.

==== Hillel Ticktin/Critique ====
In 1973 the Marxist, Hillel H. Ticktin, wrote that the Soviet "system is sinking deeper into crisis". In 1976 he entitled an article: "The USSR: the Beginning of the End?". In 1978 he predicted that the Soviet Union would "break asunder and develop either to capitalism or to socialism". And in 1983 he wrote that "the system is drawing to a close". (For a summary of Ticktin's approach, see Wikipedia's Stalinism entry.)

=== Late Cold War ===
==== Raymond Aron ====
David Fromkin wrote of Raymond Aron's prediction,

I know of only one person who came close to getting it right: Raymond Aron, the French philosopher and liberal anti-Communist. In a talk on the Soviet threat that I heard him give in the 1980s at the International Institute for Strategic Studies in London, he reminded the audience of Machiavelli's observation in The Prince that 'all armed prophets have conquered and all unarmed ones failed.' But what happens, Aron asked, if the prophet, having conquered and then ruled by force of arms, loses faith in his own prophecy? In the answer to that question, Aron suggested, lay the key to understanding the future of the Soviet Union.

==== Ravi Batra ====
The economist Ravi Batra predicted the collapse of the USSR in his 1978 book The Downfall of Capitalism and Communism.

==== Randall Collins ====
In 1980 the sociologist Randall Collins presented his paper "The future decline of the Russian empire" at the University of South Florida and at Columbia University. He later published his predictions in the book "Weberian sociological theory" (1986).

==== Robert M. Cutler ====
In 1980, the political scientist Robert M. Cutler published an article "Soviet Dissent under Khrushchev" that concluded that the following events were likely: (1) that in the generational turnover of elites after Brezhnev died (which began when he died in 1982), the Soviet regime would seek to increase public participation (which began in 1985 via glasnost, after two more top gerontocrats had died); (2) that the Communist Party's rule would be challenged in Central Asia (which occurred in the 1986 rioting in Kazakhstan before the Baltic republics erupted); and (3) that Party leaders at the local level would go their own way if the Party did not give them a reason to remain loyal to the Moscow center (which occurred in all republics in the late 1980s, but most dramatically when the new RCP and the RSFSR sapped some of the power of the CPSU and the USSR in 1990–1991).

==== James Dale Davidson and William Rees-Mogg ====
James Dale Davidson and William Rees-Mogg predicted the collapse of the Soviet Union in their book The Great Reckoning in the early 1980s.

==== Milton Friedman and Rose Friedman ====
Milton Friedman and his wife Rose mentioned briefly in their book Free to Choose (1980) that "the collapse of communism and its replacement by a market system, seems unlikely, though as incurable optimists we do not rule it out completely."

==== Robert Gates ====
Stewart Brand said when introducing the work of Philip Tetlock that Brand's partner had given a talk in the 1980s to top Central Intelligence Agency people about the future of the Soviet Union. One scenario he raised was that the Soviet bloc might break up; a sign of this happening would be the rise of unknown Mikhail Gorbachev through the party ranks. A CIA analyst said that the presentation was fine, but there was no way the Soviet Union was going to break up in his lifetime or his children's lifetime. The analyst's name was Robert Gates.

On the other hand, in hearings before the U.S. Senate on March 19, 1986, when Gates (then head of the CIA's Directorate of Intelligence) was asked "what kind of work the Intelligence Community was doing to prepare policymakers for the consequences of change in the Soviet Union," he responded: "Quite frankly, without any hint that such fundamental change is going on, my resources do not permit me the luxury of sort of just idly speculating on what a different kind of Soviet Union might look like."

==== Anatoliy Golitsyn ====
In 1984, Anatoliy Golitsyn, an important KGB defector published the book New Lies For Old, wherein he predicted the collapse of the communist bloc orchestrated from above; but he didn't mention any possible collapse of the USSR itself.

He claimed this collapse was part of a long-term deception strategy designed to lull the West into a false sense of security, abolish all containment policies, and in time finally economically cripple and diplomatically isolate the United States.

Among other things, Golitsyn stated:

- "The 'liberalization' [in the Soviet Union] would be spectacular and impressive. Formal pronouncements might be made about a reduction in the communist party's role; its monopoly would be apparently curtailed."
- "If [liberalization] should be extended to East Germany, demolition of the Berlin Wall might even be contemplated."
- "The European Parliament might become an all-European socialist parliament with representation from the Soviet Union and Eastern Europe. 'Europe from the Atlantic to the Urals' would turn out to be a neutral, socialist Europe."

Collaborating opinions can be found in an archive of classified documents collected by Vladimir Bukovsky, a defector also.

==== Andrew Greeley ====
In 1981, Andrew Greeley gave these predictions:

Before 1990

- The present Communist government in the Soviet Union will be overthrown either by a violent internal revolution or more likely by a “social democratic” faction within the party.
- Some of the constituent republics (the Ukraine, for example) will obtain authentic separate status. The Soviet colonies in Eastern Europe will then go the same route.

==== Werner Obst ====
In 1985 German economist Werner Obst published a book entitled Der Rote Stern verglüht. Moskaus Abstieg - Deutschlands Chance (The Red Star is Dying Away. Moscow's Decline - Germany's Chance), Munich: Wirtschaftsverlag Langen-Müller/Herbig, third edition in 1987, in which he predicted the collapse of the Soviet bloc and the reunification of Germany within the immediate future for about 1990, based on the analysis of economical statistics and trends.

==== Ronald Reagan ====
United States President Ronald Reagan, throughout his 1980 election campaign and first term in office presented a public view that the Soviet Union had been growing in power relative to the United States. In 1981 he stated that "the Soviet Union has been engaged in the greatest military buildup in the history of man." and the next year stated that "on balance the Soviet Union does have a definite margin of superiority" compared to the US military.

The Reagan administration used a perceived strength of the Soviet Union to justify a significant expansion of military spending according to David Arbel and Ran Edelist. In their study Western Intelligence and the dissolution of the Soviet Union they argue it was this position by the Reagan administration that prevented the American intelligence agencies from predicting the demise of the USSR. Arbel and Edelist further argued that CIA analysts were encouraged to present any information exaggerating the Soviet threat and justifying the military buildup, while contrary evidence of Soviet weakness was ignored and those presenting it sidelined.

At the same time Reagan expressed a long range view that the Soviet Union could eventually be defeated. On March 3, 1983, President Reagan told the National Association of Evangelicals in Orlando, Florida: "I believe that communism is another sad, bizarre chapter in human history whose last pages, even now, are being written."

In his June 1982 address to the British Parliament he stated:

It is the Soviet Union that runs against the tide of history by denying human freedom and human dignity to its citizens. It also is in deep economic difficulty. The rate of growth in the national product has been steadily declining since the fifties and is less than half of what it was then. The dimensions of this failure are astounding: A country which employs one-fifth of its population in agriculture is unable to feed its own people. Were it not for the private sector, the tiny private sector tolerated in Soviet agriculture, the country might be on the brink of famine.... Overcentralized, with little or no incentives, year after year the Soviet system pours its best resource into the making of instruments of destruction. The constant shrinkage of economic growth combined with the growth of military production is putting a heavy strain on the Soviet people. What we see here is a political structure that no longer corresponds to its economic base, a society where productive forces are hampered by political ones. ...In the Communist world as well, man's instinctive desire for freedom and self-determination surfaces again and again. To be sure, there are grim reminders of how brutally the police state attempts to snuff out this quest for self-rule – 1953 in East Germany, 1956 in Hungary, 1968 in Czechoslovakia, 1981 in Poland. But the struggle continues in Poland. And we know that there are even those who strive and suffer for freedom within the confines of the Soviet Union itself. ...What I am describing now is a plan and a hope for the long term – the march of freedom and democracy which will leave Marxism–Leninism on the ash heap of history as it has left other tyrannies which stifle the freedom and muzzle the self-expression of the people. And that's why we must continue our efforts to strengthen NATO even as we move forward with our Zero-Option initiative in the negotiations on intermediate-range forces and our proposal for a one-third reduction in strategic ballistic missile warheads.

Analyst Jeffrey W. Knopf has argued that Reagan went beyond everyone else:

Reagan stands out in part because he believed the Soviet Union could be defeated. For most of the Cold War, Republican and Democratic administrations alike had assumed the Soviet Union would prove durable for the foreseeable future. The bipartisan policy of containment aimed to keep the Soviet Union in check while trying to avoid nuclear war; it did not seek to force the dissolution of the Soviet empire. Ronald Reagan, in contrast, believed that the Soviet economy was so weak that increased pressure could bring the Soviet Union to the brink of failure. He therefore periodically expressed confidence that the forces of democracy 'will leave Marxism–Leninism on the ash heap of history'.

==== P.R. Sarkar ====
The leader of the Ananda Marga cult in West Bengal, P.R. Sarkar, predicted in the 1980s that Soviet Communism would fall with "a few blows from the hammer". He cited "inner and external stasis" as major weaknesses of communism.

==== Ruhollah Khomeini ====
On 7 January 1989, Ayatollah Ruhollah Khomeini, supreme leader of Iran, sent a letter to Mikhail Gorbachev, the General Secretary of the Soviet Union. This letter was Khomeini's only known written message to a foreign leader. Khomeini's letter was delivered by the Iranian politicians Abdollah Javadi-Amoli, Mohammad-Javad Larijani, and Marzieh Hadidchi. In the letter, Khomeini declared that communism was dissolving within the Soviet bloc, and invited Gorbachev to consider Islam as an alternative to communist ideology.

==== Anders Åslund ====
Anders Åslund predicted the fall of the Soviet Union in the 1989 book Gorbachev’s Struggle for Economic Reform.

== Analysis of inaccurate predictions by Sovietologists ==
According to Kevin Brennan:

Sovietology failed because it operated in an environment that encouraged failure. Sovietologists of all political stripes were given strong incentives to ignore certain facts and focus their interest in other areas. I don't mean to suggest that there was a giant conspiracy at work; there wasn't. It was just that there were no careers to be had in questioning the conventional wisdom. ... There were other kinds of institutional biases as well, such as those that led to the ... "Team B" Report."

Seymour Martin Lipset and György Bence write:

Given these judgments of the Soviet future made by political leaders and journalists, the question is why were they right and so many of our Sovietological colleagues wrong. The answer again in part must be ideological. Reagan and Levin came from rightist backgrounds, and Moynihan, much like the leaders of the AFL–CIO, from a leftist anti-Stalinist social-democratic milieu, environments that disposed participants to believe the worst. Most of the Sovietologists, on the other hand, were left-liberal in their politics, an orientation that undermined their capacity to accept the view that economic statism, planning, socialist incentives, would not work. They were also for the most part ignorant of, or ignored, the basic Marxist formulation that it is impossible to build socialism in impoverished societies. Brzezinski's 1969 collection, Dilemmas of Change in Soviet Politics demonstrates this point, of "the fourteen contributors...Two-thirds (four out of six) of those who foresaw a serious possibility of breakdown were, like Levin and Moynihan, nonacademics. Three quarters (six out of eight) of those who could not look beyond system continuity were scholars.

Richard Pipes took a slightly different view, situating the failure of the Sovietological profession in the larger context of the failures of social science:

It seems likely that ultimately the reason for the failure of professionals to understand the Soviet predicament lay in their indifference to the human factor. In the desire to emulate the successes of the natural scientists, whose judgments are "value free," politology (sic) and sociology have been progressively dehumanized, constructing model and relying on statistics (many of them falsified) and, in the process, losing contact with the subject of their inquiries—the messy, contradictory, unpredictable homo sapiens.

== See also ==
- Khomeini's letter to Mikhail Gorbachev
- Americathon
- Economy of the Soviet Union
- History of the Soviet Union (1964–1982)
- History of the Soviet Union (1982–1991)
- Prometheism
