= After the Empire =

2001 book by Emmanuel Todd

After the Empire: The Breakdown of the American Order
- English cover
- Author: Emmanuel Todd
- Original title: Après L'Empire: essai sur la décomposition du système américain
- Language: French
- Subject: Politics
- Publisher: Columbia University Press
- Publication date: 12 November 2003
- Publication place: France
- Pages: 192
- ISBN: 0-231-13102-X
- OCLC: 52813734
- Dewey Decimal: 327.73 22
- LC Class: E902 .T63 2003

After the Empire: The Breakdown of the American Order (French: Après L'Empire: essai sur la décomposition du système américain) is a 2002 book by French demographer and sociologist Emmanuel Todd. In it, Todd examines the fundamental weaknesses of the modern United States to conclude that, contrary to American conventional wisdom, the United States is rapidly losing control of the world stage economically, militarily, and ideologically. Todd predicts the fall of the United States as the sole global superpower. Todd often presents his views in contrast to Zbigniew Brzezinski's The Grand Chessboard. It became a bestseller in France and was commented on most favorably in France and Japan.

== 1976 prediction of Soviet collapse ==
Todd attracted attention in 1976 when, aged 25, he predicted the fall of the Soviet Union based on indicators such as increasing infant mortality rates. In the late 1970s, Todd was widely pronounced an "anti-communist", just as, following the publication of After the Empire, he has been attacked as "anti-American". He challenges these labels and describes himself as a historian and anthropologist first; and it was his concern as a historian, rather than political passion, that motivated him to write After the Empire. In late 2002, he believed that the world was about to repeat the same mistake that it had made in regard to the Soviet Union during the 1970s—misinterpreting an expansion in US military activity as a sign of its increasing power, when in fact this aggression masks a decline.

== Summary ==
Foreword

In the foreword to the German edition, Todd stresses the importance of the Franco-German alliance: Without the German resistance to the Iraq war as a signal for the "departure of Europe into strategic autonomy", France would not have been able to influence the UN to delay the war plans of the USA. The next stage should be explicit cooperation with Russia.

=== 1. The Myth of Global Terrorism ===
Todd argues that the rise of global terrorism is overstated and mainly serves American interests by justifying military interventions. He sees Islamic fundamentalism as a transitional phenomenon tied to modernizing societies, not an existential threat.

=== 2. Democracy as a Threat ===
Democracy is spreading globally through education, challenging the U.S.'s role as a global overseer. Todd contends that American power relies on maintaining disorder, while Europe moves towards strategic autonomy and partnerships with Russia.

=== 3. Imperial Dimensions ===
The U.S. mirrors historical empires like Rome by consuming more than it produces, relying on external wealth. However, its military and ideological power are insufficient to sustain its dominance, marking the decline of its imperial status. Todd critiques the principle of comparative cost advantage, framing it as a constructed American export akin to Hollywood films, whose veracity is highly questionable. This critique is reinforced by the observable and widening imbalances in global trade, which deviate significantly from equilibrium and amplify disparities among participating nations. The global economy is sustained by domestic consumption, with the American masses effectively acting as Keynesian “civil servants” providing economic stimulus. This condition is likened to ancient Rome, where society was divided between a wealthy plutocracy and a dependent plebeian class, maintained by the inflow of resources from conquered territories. Unlike ancient Rome, however, the United States lacks the two critical components of imperial sustainability: the military and economic capacity to enforce exploitation and a declining universalist ideology that no longer upholds egalitarian principles in its treatment of peoples and nations.

=== 4. The Fragility of Tribute ===
America's global financial dominance depends on investments driven by perceived safety, despite evident risks. The U.S. lacks the military and ideological strength to sustain these flows, threatening its economic supremacy. The USA could only maintain its claim longer if it lived its universalism (as all world empires did before) and did not treat people outside the US, especially in the Arabic-Islamic world, as second-class, which Todd sees as the main ideological tendency of Americans at present.

=== 5. The Movement away from Universalism ===
Todd highlights America's fading commitment to universalism, as it increasingly treats groups unequally. He links this shift to historical family structures and argues it weakens the country's ideological appeal. Under the competitive pressures of the Cold War, the United States sought to present itself as an attractive alternative to communism, leading to increased efforts toward the integration of marginalized groups, including African Americans. However, with the dissolution of this ideological rivalry, exclusionary tendencies have resurfaced, disproportionately affecting Black and Hispanic populations. Todd illustrates this regression through disparities in infant mortality rates and their evolution across different demographic groups in the U.S. He argues that these exclusions are perceived as necessary trade-offs to achieve integration for other groups, such as Jewish and Japanese Americans. For instance, America's pronounced one-sided support for Israel exemplifies a shift away from universalist principles toward more selective and exclusionary application of democratic and egalitarian ideals, which further alienates Arab and Muslim nations. Todd concludes that the United States has lost the cultural and ideological dynamism of a victorious power capable of fostering cultural fusion. Contemporary America, in contrast to its past, is increasingly unproductive and marked by diminishing tolerance.

=== 6. Confront the Strong or Attack the Weak ===
The U.S. compensates for its military and economic inadequacies by targeting weaker nations, particularly in the Islamic world. This strategy exposes its declining global influence and inability to confront stronger powers. Following the collapse of the Soviet Union, Emmanuel Todd argues that the U.S. political elite failed to develop a coherent long-term strategy. Instead, they opted for the path of least resistance, a course that lacked strategic consistency even when informed by frameworks like Zbigniew Brzezinski's vision outlined in The Grand Chessboard. According to Todd, the American elite has largely abandoned strategic or imperial planning, instead adopting reactive, short-term measures to address immediate challenges. This approach, combined with limited resources and dependence on global systems, has led to an exaggerated focus on peripheral conflicts as a means of projecting power. Todd highlights the United States' fixation on Islamic countries as indicative of deeper structural weaknesses, substantiating his claims with extensive evidence. He identifies three key issues: The increasing critique of the role of women in Islamic societies reflects a decline in the U.S.'s universalist ideological framework; the obsession with securing Arab oil underscores the dramatic erosion of America's economic efficiency; The focus on militarily weak Islamic nations serves to obscure deficiencies in U.S. land-based military capabilities.

=== 7. The Return of Russia ===
Russia, despite demographic challenges, is re-emerging as a global player with a universalist tradition. Todd sees it as a stabilizing force that could counterbalance U.S. influence and foster regional democracy.

=== 8. The Emancipation of Europe ===
Europe increasingly views the U.S. as a destabilizing force and moves towards independence in policy and economy. Todd envisions a future where Europe aligns with Russia and other partners, further marginalizing American influence.

=== 9. Conclusion: Endgame ===
The U.S. faces inevitable decline due to economic and ideological weaknesses, while Europe and other regions rise. Todd predicts a multipolar world driven by demographics and education, with the U.S. eventually regaining democracy and productivity through crisis. Emmanuel Todd forecasts the decline of American hegemony by 2050, asserting that this shift will transform the United States into a regular global power rather than signaling its disappearance. He argues that no other nation—be it Europe, Russia, or Japan—will rise to fill the hegemonic vacuum, resulting in a geopolitical "stalemate," akin to a chess endgame without a decisive winner. Todd advocates for the United States to return to its roots as a democratic and liberal nation-state while addressing its trade imbalances. He predicts a necessary reduction in the American standard of living by approximately 15–20%, though he underscores the adaptability of the U.S. economy as a mitigating factor. Moreover, Todd emphasizes the importance of restructuring global governance, proposing that Japan and Germany, as the world's second and third largest economies, become permanent members of the United Nations Security Council to enhance its legitimacy and effectiveness. He highlights Japan's pacifist stance, shaped by its unique historical experience with atomic bombings, and its divergent economic perspective from Anglo-Saxon models as beneficial to global equilibrium. Regarding Germany, he acknowledges opposition due to existing Western dominance in the Security Council, suggesting that Germany might share a seat with France to address concerns about overrepresentation of Western nations.

== Basic Thesis ==
The basic thesis of this book is that the US is about to lose its status as the "last remaining superpower". They can no longer muster the military, economic and ideological qualities required for this. This results in their increasing unpredictability and aggressiveness. This is also interpreted as a sign of their increasing weakness and as a reaction of frustration to their de facto economic dependence on the constantly emancipating great powers of Europe and Japan.

The current USA has developed into a "predatory state" that itself has massive industrial and foreign trade deficits and therefore absorbs the finances and products of all other states and redistributes its wealth in its own country at the expense of minorities and lower classes and to the advantage of the super-rich anti-democratic upper class.

A data analysis and comparisons with historical empires lead Todd to the conviction that the United States would regress to a regional power within the next few decades, while the EU, with a resurgent Russia, together with Japan, will determine world events in the future.

According to his forecast, Europe and the United States are in the process of moving away from each other, accelerated by the military adventures of the latter power in the Middle East. The immediate consequence is an intensification of relations between Germany and France, perhaps also Great Britain. At the same time, more and more states are turning to Europe.

== Post-Cold War geopolitical climate ==
Todd writes that the United States became an empire not by strategy but by accident, following the sudden collapse of its main adversary, the Soviet Union. With the globalization of investment, it then indulged in the luxury of conspicuous consumption using incoming capital while going deeper and deeper into debt. In reality America is like a crumbling Roman Empire—overextended with excessive arms spending, inequality and disgruntlement at home. To keep the rest of the world in line, and prevent its creditors calling in their debts, all America needs to do then is to wield a big stick.

"The real America is too weak to take on anyone except military midgets," Todd states. This is why there is such hostility to states such as North Korea, Cuba, and Iraq, an underdeveloped country of 24 million exhausted by a decade of sanctions. Such "conflicts that represent little or no military risk" allow a US presence throughout the world. Further, the "theatrical media coverage...must not blind us to a fundamental reality: the size of the opponent chosen by the US is the true indicator of its current power". Todd argues that America would be incapable of challenging a more powerful country, and that "only one threat to global stability hangs over the world today—the United States itself, which was once a protector and is now a predator."

== Predictions ==
Todd is above all a demographer, and he bases much of his opinion on statistical elements. Therefore, Todd notes some disturbing American trends, such as rising stratification based on educational credentials, and the "obsolescence of unreformable political institutions." Increasingly, he argues, the rest of the world is producing so that America can consume.

Todd argues the risk to the United States is that its clumsy tactics could backfire by provoking a geostrategic realignment and alliance in Europe and Asia. In the future the real power will rest with Europe. Todd suggests that Eurasia possesses the majority of global wealth and is able to work with other countries because it shares a universalist ethic that respects the rest of the world, including Arab and Muslim countries. Europe will evolve into a united force and its protected industrial base will allow it to rapidly reestablish its military might. Over time, Europe's and Russia's cultural friendship will strengthen and the Cold War-era ties which bind the United States together with Europe will be severed because of the vast divide separating "European and American civilizations", which Todd calls "the emancipation of Europe". If Europe, Russia and Japan draw closer as a result of the "drunken sailor" United States, then Washington will have achieved exactly the opposite of what it sought.

== Solutions ==
Todd believes the US should return to its universalist and egalitarian roots, expressed in the 19th century, or make genuine attempts to expand civil rights and be a stabilizing element for the world, like they were in the 1950s. Todd also believes that Europe should rearrange the geopolitical balance around a Eurasian pole consisting of a Europe led by a trio of France, Germany and the United Kingdom, relying on Russia to provide military support as well as oil and natural gas.

== Reception ==
Emmanuel Todd forecasts the decline of American hegemony by 2050, asserting that this shift will transform the United States into a regular global power rather than signaling its disappearance. He argues that no other nation—be it Europe, Russia, or Japan—will rise to fill the hegemonic vacuum, resulting in a geopolitical "stalemate," akin to a chess endgame without a decisive winner.

Todd advocates for the United States to return to its roots as a democratic and liberal nation-state while addressing its trade imbalances. He predicts a necessary reduction in the American standard of living by approximately 15–20%, though he underscores the adaptability of the U.S. economy as a mitigating factor.

Moreover, Todd emphasizes the importance of restructuring global governance, proposing that Japan and Germany, as the world's second and third largest economies, become permanent members of the United Nations Security Council to enhance its legitimacy and effectiveness. He highlights Japan's pacifist stance, shaped by its unique historical experience with atomic bombings, and its divergent economic perspective from Anglo-Saxon models as beneficial to global equilibrium. Regarding Germany, he acknowledges opposition due to existing Western dominance in the Security Council, suggesting that Germany might share a seat with France to address concerns about overrepresentation of Western nations.

According to Booklist, "[Todd] has written what may be the most important work since Francis Fukuyama's The End of History and the Last Man (1992)".

Alexander Kirshner wrote in the Washington Monthly that "Emmanuel Todd's After the Empire has been a bestseller in France for most of the last year--which should tell you a lot about the book even before you read the first page. In substance and tone, Todd's writing bears a strong resemblance to that of conservative intellectuals, like Robert Kagan, who proclaim the inevitability of American dominance. But Todd's thesis is the exact opposite of the neocons'...Like the neocons' worldview, Todd's theory combines a wishful vision of the future and nationalistic triumphalism in a way that sidesteps the facts...We and our allies are, in a word, interdependent. That may sound dull and 'interdependence' won't sell many books. But unlike the theories of Todd and the neocons, it happens to be true."

Clare Short wrote in the New Statesman: "I would recommend this extraordinary book to everyone troubled by US neo-imperialism. It asks why 'America is now commonly perceived as a narcissistic, warmongering bully. How did a country that until recently played an essential role in building international order suddenly become a symbol of global disorder?'...I doubt that anyone will sign up for all of Emmanuel Todd's analysis, but this is a brave and challenging book which contains a great deal of truth."

Anne Penketh wrote on The Independent that "Todd is at his most convincing when examining developments from his perspective as a demographer. He demonstrates the twin benefits of a drop in birth-rates and rise in literacy. His contrasting studies of American, European and Russian family structures are fascinating. After the Empire seems on shakier ground when drawing conclusions from economic trends".

Roger Kaplan wrote a very critical review of the book in The Weekly Standard: according to Kaplan "After the Empire is silly, mean-spirited, and anti-Semitic bile, bigoted to a degree that borders on racist condescension. It is poorly written and foolishly argued. When Todd thinks he has data supporting an argument, he uses them; when he wants to extend the argument to an area where there are inadequate data, he offers sweeping intuitions..."

== See also ==
- American decline
- Ideocracy
- State collapse
- Thucydides Trap – when one great power threatens to displace another, war is almost always the result
