= The East is rising and the West is declining =

Term in Chinese political rhetoric

The East is rising and the West is declining (simplified Chinese: 东升西降; traditional Chinese: 東升西降; pinyin: Dōngshēng Xījiàng) is a phrase in Chinese political rhetoric first introduced in 2020 by Xi Jinping, the general secretary of the Chinese Communist Party (CCP), referring to geopolitical shifts in international order where the Eastern world, represented by the China, is rising in both economic, technological and strategic prominence, while the Western world, represented by the United States, is gradually declining in their power, prestige and influence. The concept is in accordance to Xi's earlier remarks in 2018 that the world is experiencing "great changes unseen in a century".

== History ==
Xi first said the phrase in October 2020, during the fifth plenary session of the 19th Central Committee of the Chinese Communist Party, while his remarks were first revealed publicly in January 2021. Xi said China was entering a period of opportunity because "the East is rising and the West is declining". He also called said the "biggest source of chaos in the present-day world is the United States". However, Xi also warned that despite China's rise, there were still many ways where "the West is strong and the East is weak". Following Xi's comments, the phrase was also used by other CCP officials.

== See also ==
- American decline
- Chinese Century
- Great changes unseen in a century
- Occidentalism
- The East wind prevails over the West wind
