= The East wind prevails over the West wind =

Maoist slogan

- Chinese: 东风压倒西风
- Coined by: Mao Zedong

The East wind prevails over the West wind (Chinese: 东风压倒西风; pinyin: dōngfēng yādǎo xīfēng), alternatively translated as the east wind overwhelms the west wind, the East wind is prevailing over the West wind, or socialism will prevail over capitalism, is a slogan coined by Mao Zedong in the early 1950s, when he referred to the east wind as the socialist camp and the West wind as the Western capitalist societies. The implication of this statement is that the forces of socialism have overwhelmingly surpassed the forces of imperialism.

== History ==
"The East wind prevails over the West wind" was borrowed by Mao Zedong from the classical novel Dream of the Red Chamber in which Lin Daiyu said, "In all families, either the East Wind prevails over the West Wind, or the West Wind prevails over the East Wind". In the book, East and West are not seen as representing different sets of beliefs or values.

== See also ==
- The East is rising and the West is declining
