= Emmanuel Todd =

French historian, demographer, sociologist, and political scientist (born 1951)

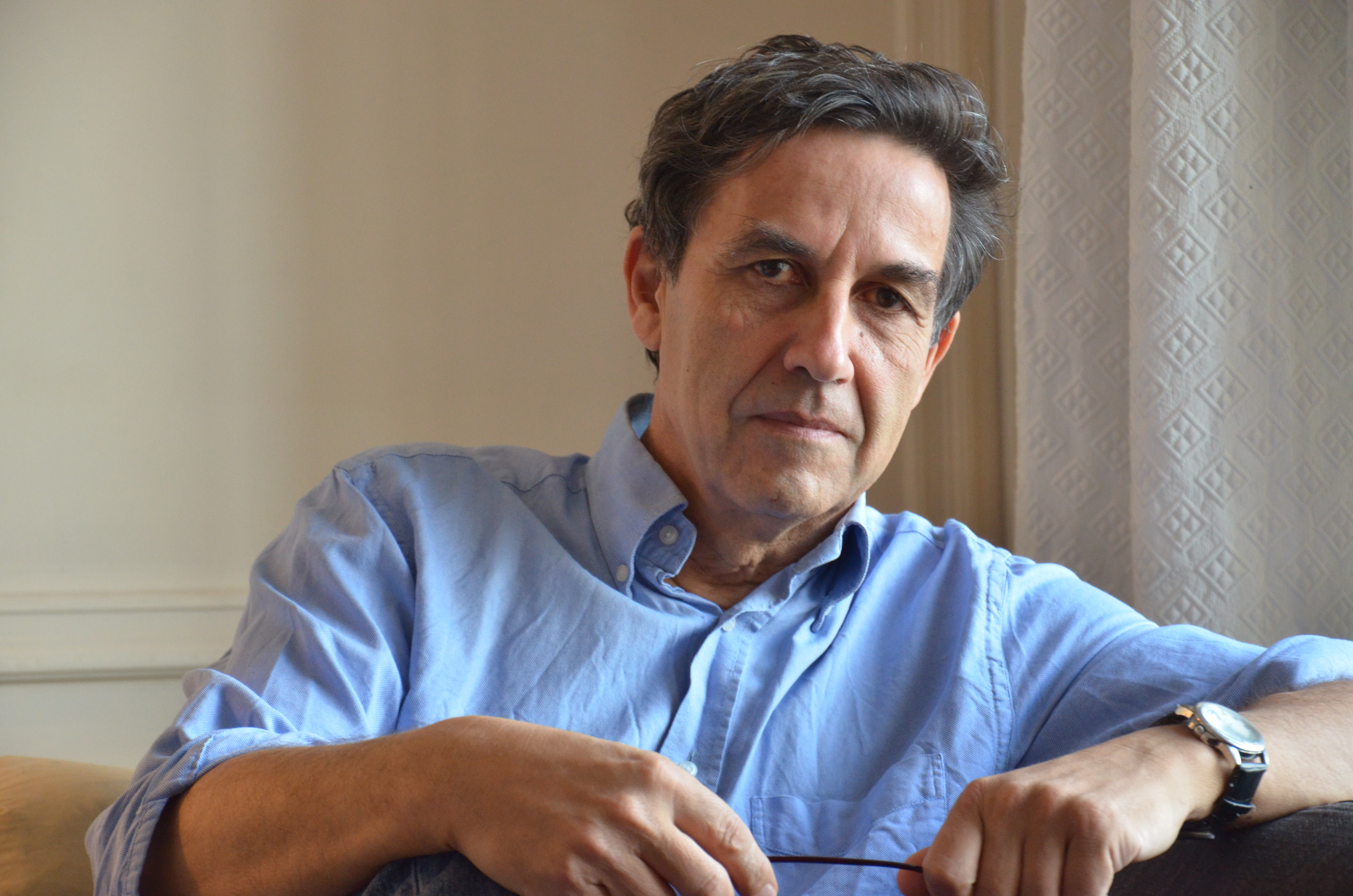
- Todd in 2014
- Born: 16 May 1951 (age 75); Saint-Germain-en-Laye, Yvelines, France
- Education: Pantheon-Sorbonne University; Paris Institute of Political Studies; Trinity College, Cambridge (PhD)
- Known for: Predicting the fall of the Soviet Union
- Scientific career
- Fields: History, anthropology, demographics, sociology, political science
- Workplaces: Institut national d'études démographiques
- Thesis: Seven peasant communities in pre-industrial Europe: A comparative study of French, Italian and Swedish rural parishes (18th and early 19th century) (1976)
- Doctoral advisor: Peter Laslett

Emmanuel Todd (French: [ɛmanɥɛl tɔd]; born 16 May 1951) is a French historian, anthropologist, demographer, sociologist and political scientist at the National Institute of Demographic Studies (INED) in Paris. His research focuses on family structures across the world, and explores how they relate to beliefs, ideologies, political systems, and historical developments. He has also authored several political essays, which have received wide coverage in France.

== Early life and education ==
Born in Saint-Germain-en-Laye, Yvelines, Emmanuel Todd is the son of journalist Olivier Todd and Anne-Marie Nizan. His paternal grandfather, Julius Oblatt, was of Austrian Jewish background, and his paternal grandmother, Helen Todd, was the illegitimate daughter of British magazine editor Dorothy Todd.

Todd’s maternal grandfather was the writer Paul Nizan. The historian Emmanuel Le Roy Ladurie, a pioneer of microhistory, was a close family friend and later became Todd’s mentor, training him in the discipline of historical anthropology.

Todd attended the Lycée international de Saint-Germain-en-Laye. During the May 68 protests, at age seventeen, he joined the Communist Youth, though his involvement was brief. He later studied political science at the Paris Institute of Political Studies (Sciences Po) and went on to pursue a Ph.D. in history at Trinity College, Cambridge, under the supervision of two anthropologically minded social historians: Peter Laslett and Alan Macfarlane. In 1976, he defended his doctoral thesis on Seven peasant communities in pre-industrial Europe. A comparative study of French, Italian and Swedish rural parishes (18th and early 19th century).

== Career ==
Todd gained public attention in 1976, at age 25, when he predicted the collapse of the Soviet Union, basing his analysis on indicators such as rising infant mortality rates, and methodologically inspired by approaches of the annales school. Commentator Jacob Collins also notes a few references to George Orwell's dystopian novel 1984. This prediction was published in La chute finale: Essais sur la décomposition de la sphère Soviétique (The Final Fall: An Essay on the Decomposition of the Soviet Sphere).

He later worked briefly in the literary department of Le Monde daily, before returning to academic research. His subsequent work focused on the hypothesis that familial systems shape ideologies and religious or political beliefs (Explanation of Ideology: Family Structure & Social System, 1985).

He has been employed by the National Institute of Demographic Studies (INED) in Paris.

== Works ==
Among other books, Emmanuel Todd wrote The Invention of Europe (1990) and Le destin des immigrés (1994) (The fate of immigrants), in which he defended the "French model" of immigrants integration.

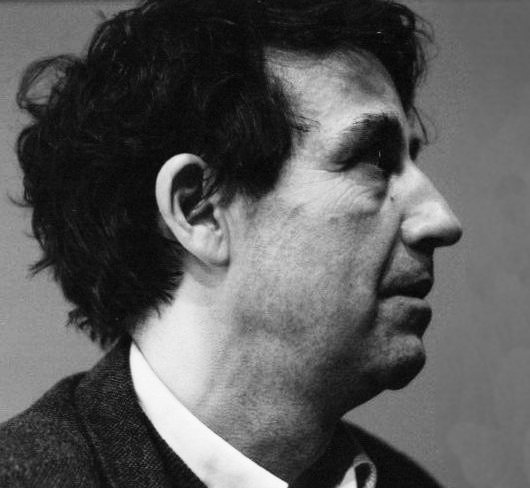
Emmanuel Todd circa 2009.

Todd opposed the Maastricht Treaty in the 1992 referendum. In 1995, he authored a memo for the Fondation Saint-Simon, that gained widespread attention; the media subsequently credited him with coining the phrase "fracture sociale" (social crack or social gap), which was notably used by Jacques Chirac during the 1995 presidential campaign to distinguish himself from his rival Édouard Balladur. However, Todd denied originating the term and attributed the expression to Marcel Gauchet.

In The Explanation of Ideology: Family Structure & Social Systems, Todd explores how diverse family structures influence beliefs, ideologies, political systems, and historical development. As anthropologist David Kertzer summarises: "Building on both Le Play and Freud, Todd argues, that ideological systems are products of family concepts with family organization being the true infrastructure, not itself determined by any other social, economic, or cultural forces". Susan Greenhalgh characterises the book as "deliberatively provocative and at once annoying and impressive" and states that "although the author's argument needs substantial conceptual and empirical shaping up, the book contains many rewarding insights and deserves to be given serious consideration by anthropologists and political scientists alike." In Lineages of Modernity: A History of Humanity from the Stone Age to Homo Americanus, reviewed by James C. Bennett, he offers a compelling reinterpretation of modern history—mapping how family systems ripple through religion, politics, economy, and cultural attitudes. Bennett sees it as a vital contribution for rethinking globalization with deeper cultural sensitivity and warns against ignoring these underlying dynamics. And Alan Barnard considers it as a "thoroughly interesting and unusual text".

In After the Empire: The Breakdown of the American Order (2002), reviewed by Andrej Kreutz and in 2004 by economist Jacqueline Grapin, Todd contends that various indicators — economic, demographic, and ideological— suggest the United States has lost its status as the world's sole superpower. He also argues that many other societies are modernizing (e.g., experiencing declining birth rates) much faster than previously anticipated. Controversially, Todd claims that U.S. foreign policy often serves to obscure the country's waning global influence. In his analysis, Vladimir Putin’s Russia emerges as a potentially more reliable global partner than the United States.

Despite his earlier opposition to the Maastricht Treaty in 1992, Todd later supported the referendum of 2005 on the proposed Treaty establishing a Constitution for Europe, advocating for a protectionist framework for future EU policies.

In A Convergence of Civilizations: The Transformation of Muslim Societies Around the World (2007), co-authored with demographer and Middle East specialist Youssef Courbage, the authors consider that as religion declines and literacy rates reach fifty percent, societies tend to converge along similar civilizational paths. They maintain that these dynamics also apply to contemporary Muslim societies, challenging Samuel P. Huntington's thesis of a clash of civilizations.

During this period, Todd was also working on "The Origins of Family Systems", which he has described as "his life's work". The first volume was published in 2011. He stated that in researching the book over 40 years, he had "read more anthropology monographs than most anthropologists." By 2011 he considered the research complete, with only the second and final volume left to be written.

Todd’s 2015 essay Qui est Charlie? Sociologie d'une crise religieuse (Who is Charlie? Sociology of a Religious Crisis) became both his most controversial and most widely read work. In it, he argues that the mass rallies held on 11 January 2015, in response to the Charlie Hebdo massacre, were not a celebration of French liberal values but rather an expression of racist and reactionary undercurrents in French society. Sara Waters writes that "What the demonstrators were actually fighting for, Todd argues, was the freedom to ridicule and insult the sacred religious figurehead of a stigmatised and disadvantaged ethnic minority. French national identity had become bound up with the right to blaspheme". While some analysts have interpreted the book as suggesting that the Je suis Charlie movement revealed a hidden “religious crisis” at the heart of French politics, others criticized Todd for appearing to downplay Islamist terrorism and for relying on unsubstantiated claims while neglecting key political contexts. The book provoked widespread backlash, including criticism from - then - Prime Minister Manuel Valls . Todd has admitted to writing it quickly and in a non-academic style, motivated by frustration, though he stands by its foundation in decades of demographic research.

His book Lineages of the Feminine: An Outline of the History of Women (Où en sont-elles? Une esquisse de l'histoire des femmes), Todd argues that women have achieved emancipation and questions the existence of patriarchy in Western Europe. The book has been met with both praise and criticism.

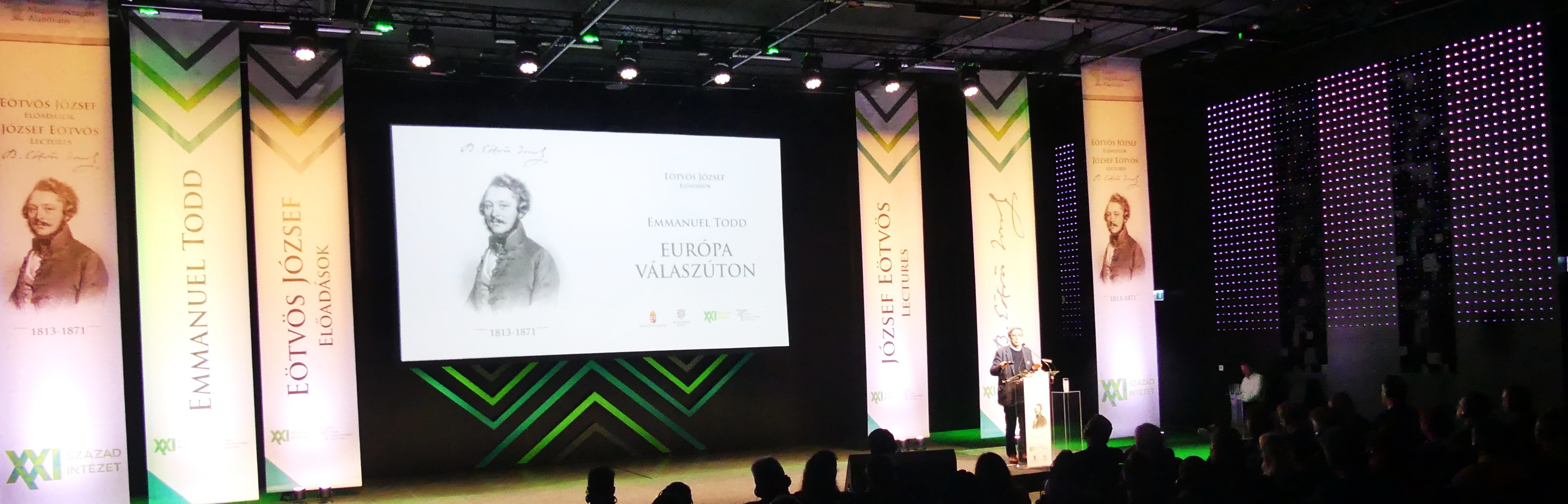
Europe at a Crossroads, conference in Budapest - 2025.

In La défaite de l'Occident (The defeat of the West), Todd claims that Putin's Russia has triumphed over a deindustralised and nihilist West, weakened by the decline of Protestantism. The French press gave the book mixed reviews, with critics accusing Todd of being “blinded by ideology,” “ignorant of the subject,” or relying on Russian propaganda and conspiracy theories. However, the book was reviewed by anthropologist John A. Agnew who writes, in 2024 that "so far this book has met with a largely positive reaction by the pundits on the nationalist right in the United States and Europe, even though in the past, Todd as never openly affiliated himself with such quarters". The book received praise from journalist Christopher Caldwell in The New York Times, and was well received by official Russian media.

== Awards and recognition ==
Todd's recognitions include the Prix de l'Assemblée nationale 1995 for his Le Destin des immigrés, and the Prix Paul-Michel-Perret 2012 of the Académie des sciences morales et politiques, for his L'Origine des systèmes familiaux, volume 1: L'Eurasie, Paris (Gallimard), 2011.

== Books ==
Some of his books have been translated into several European and Asian languages.

=== With an English translation ===
- The Final Fall: An Essay on the Decomposition of the Soviet Sphere, 1979, Karz Publishers, translated by John Waggoner, foreword by Jean-François Revel (La chute finale: Essai sur la décomposition de la sphère Soviétique, 1976)
- The Explanation of Ideology: Family Structure & Social Systems, 1985, Blackwell Publishers, translated by David Garrioch (La Troisième planète, 1983)
- The Causes of Progress: Culture, Authority, and Change, 1987, Blackwell Publishers, translated by Richard Boulind (L'enfance du monde, 1984)
- The Making of Modern France: Ideology, Politics and Culture, 1991, Blackwell Publishers, translated by Anthony C. Forster (La Nouvelle France, 1988)
- After the Empire: The Breakdown of the American Order, 2003, Columbia University Press, translated by Christopher Jon Delogu, foreword by Michael Lind (Après l’Empire : Essai sur la décomposition du système américain, 2001)
- Todd, Emmanuel; Courbage, Youssef (2007). A Convergence of Civilizations: The Transformation of Muslim Societies Around the World. Translated by Holoch, George. Columbia University Press. OCLC 731128332. (Le Rendez-vous des civilisations, 2007)
- Who is Charlie? Xenophobia and the New Middle Class. Translated by Brown, Andrew. Bristol: Polity. 2015. OCLC 935450792. (Qui est Charlie? Sociologie d'une crise religieuse, 2015)
- Lineages of Modernity: A History of Humanity from the Stone Age to Homo Americanus. Translated by Brown, Andrew. Cambridge : Medford, MA: Polity Press. 2019. OCLC 1055567878. (Où en sommes-nous ? Une esquisse de l'histoire humaine, 2017)
- Lineages of the Feminine: An Outline of the History of Women. Translated by Brown, Andrew. Polity press, Wiley. 2023. OCLC 1378022425. (Où en sont-elles? Une esquisse de l'histoire des femmes, 2022)

=== In French ===
- Le Fou et le Prolétaire (The Fool And The Proletariat), Éditions Robert Laffont, Paris, 1979. On the pre-1914 elites of Europe, which led to World War I and totalitarianism.
- L'Invention de la France (The Invention Of France), with Hervé Le Bras (fr), Éditions Pluriel-Hachette, Paris, 1981.
- L'invention de l'Europe (The Invention of Europe), Éditions du Seuil, coll. « L'Histoire immédiate », 1990.
- Le Destin des immigrés (The Fate [Destiny] of Immigrants), Paris, Éditions Le Seuil, 1994.
- L'Illusion économique : Essai sur la stagnation des sociétés développées (The Economic Illusion: Essay on the stagnation of developed societies), Paris, Éditions Gallimard, 1998.
- La Diversité du monde : Famille et modernité (The Diversity Of The World: Family and Modernity ), Éditions Le Seuil, coll. « L'histoire immédiate », Paris, 1999.
- Après La démocratie (After Democracy), Paris, Éditions Gallimard, 2008.
- Allah n'y est pour rien ! (Allah is not to blame!), Paris, Éditions Le Publieur, coll. arretsurimages.net, 2011.
- L'Origine des systèmes familiaux, Tome 1 : L'Eurasie (The Origin Of Family Systems, Volume One: Eurasia), Paris, Éditions Gallimard, 2011, of which the translated introduction is already available online.
- Le Mystère français (The French Mystery), with Hervé Le Bras (fr), Paris, Éditions Le Seuil, coll. « La République des idées », 2013.
- La Défaite de l'Occident (The Defeat of the West ), Paris: Gallimard, 2024. ISBN 9782073041135

== See also ==
- Empiricism
- Anomie
- Émile Durkheim
- Entropy
- Max Weber
- Friedrich List
- Nuclear family
- George Murdock
- First-wave feminism
- Margaret Mead
- Second-wave feminism
- Simone de Beauvoir
- Third-wave feminism
