= Managed decline =

Business management at the end of a lifecycle

Managed decline is a phrase that refers to the management of the decline (or "sunset") phase at the end of a lifecycle, with the goal of minimizing costs or other forms of losses and harm. The concept originated in business where it referred to the management of companies and industries, but has since spread beyond to be used in other contexts.

Examples of managed decline include the handling of the textiles, shipbuilding, coalmining and steel industries in North America and Europe in the 1980s of the postal delivery services in Europe and the United States in the first decades of the 21st century, of the established churches in western Europe since the 1970s, and that of an individual's quality of life in their final years as they face old age or terminal illness.

Decline can be managed through multiple means, including public or industrial policy efforts such as government provision of retraining.

The expression "managed decline" has been used to describe United Kingdom's economic decline after the turn of the millennium. The phrase "managed decline" was also used in private advice to Margaret Thatcher from Geoffrey Howe with regards to avoiding investment in Liverpool after the 1981 Toxteth riots. The documents were confidential until 2011 when they were released by The National Archives under the thirty-year rule.

== In business strategy ==
Research in strategic management treats a declining industry as a distinct competitive environment rather than as simple failure. Drawing on a study of firms in shrinking markets, Kathryn Rudie Harrigan and Michael Porter set out four "end-game" strategies for such industries: seeking leadership of the demand that remains, retreating to a defensible niche, harvesting — extracting cash while minimizing further investment — and prompt divestment. Harrigan has separately argued that barriers to exit, such as specialized assets and commitments entered into while demand was still growing, can prevent managers from downsizing or leaving an industry once its decline has begun.

== In climate and energy policy ==
Since the mid-2010s the phrase has been used in climate policy to describe the deliberate winding down of coal, oil and gas extraction through supply-side measures, rather than allowing production to fall only in response to falling demand. The usage was set out in The Sky's Limit, a 2016 report by the campaign group Oil Change International, which argued that the reserves in already-operating fields and mines would exhaust the carbon budget associated with the Paris Agreement's temperature goals, and that governments and companies should "conduct a managed decline of the fossil fuel industry" while providing a just transition for the workers and communities dependent on it. The Lofoten Declaration, issued in August 2017 and subsequently signed by several hundred civil society organizations, called on wealthier producing countries to lead in ending fossil fuel development and to manage the decline of existing production.

The idea has been examined in academic work under headings including supply-side climate policy, "managed phase out" and "deliberate decline". Fergus Green and Richard Denniss argued in 2018 that restricting supply has economic and political advantages over demand-side instruments alone, while noting the objection that production curtailed in one country may be displaced to another. Greg Muttitt and Sivan Kartha proposed equity principles for determining which producers should reduce extraction first, and Daniel Rosenbloom and Adrian Rinscheid reviewed the emerging literature on the intentional decline of carbon-intensive systems, which they described as neglected relative to research on promoting low-carbon innovation.

== See also ==
- Palliative care
- State collapse
- Creative destruction
- Declinism
- Fossil fuel phase-out
- Just transition
- Municipal disinvestment
- Shrinking city
- Turnaround management
