= Michel Garder =

Michel Garder (20 October 1916 Saratov; 3 May 1993 Paris-Clichy) was a Russian-born French author and military man known for his writings about the Soviet Union. He notably predicted in his 1965 book L'Agonie du Régime en Russie Soviétique (The Death Struggle of the Regime in Soviet Russia) that the USSR would collapse by 1970.

== Early years ==
Garder was born in Imperial Russia. His family belonged to the local aristocracy and his grandfather was a Marshal of the Imperial Russian Army. He left Russia aged four during the Russian Civil War and settled to France with his family.

== Military career ==
Garder joined the French Army. During the Second World War, he fought in 1940 during the German invasion of France. He joined the resistance against Nazi occupation. He was arrested in 1943 and subsequently detained in several concentration camps. After the war, he worked in military intelligence and eventually retired with the rank of colonel.

== Writings ==
After retiring from the military, Garder published various writings about the Soviet Union and communist regimes. He published a biography of Mao Zedong, a book about the German-Soviet War, another about the East German Army and, 1965, L'Agonie du régime en Russie Soviétique (The Death Struggle of the Regime in Soviet Russia). In the latter book, Garder stated that the death agony of the Soviet union was evident in "the conflict between a decaying regime that no longer has any justification other than the personal interests of those who profit by it" and "the upper strata of the technological intelligentsia."

Garder argued that this contest cannot end in a compromise. There is not enough flexibility in the dictatorship. He then predicted a collapse: probably a non-communist and perhaps anti-communist take-over with the help of the military elites. "Recognition of the harebrained absurdity of a Marxist-Leninist religion has long ago become inevitable for the true elite of the country and is from day to day dawning upon millions of "average persons." There will come a moment when the technological masses "will feel impelled to seize power."

Garder's book and prediction were strongly criticized at the time. In a symposium launched to review the book, Yale Professor Frederick C. Barghoorn dismissed Garder's book as "the latest in a long line of apocalyptic predictions of the collapse of communism." He warns that "great revolutions are most infrequent and that successful political systems are tenacious and adaptive." In addition, the reviewer of the book, Michael Tatu, disapproved of the "apocalyptic character" of such a forecast and is almost apologetic for treating it seriously.

When the Soviet Union did collapse, twenty years about the date he had foreseen, Garder joked that "the corpse moved longer than expected".

== Bibliography ==
- Mao Tse Toung, Éditions de La Table Ronde, 1962
- Une guerre pas comme les autres. La guerre germano-soviétique, Éditions de La Table Ronde, 1962 (Couronné par l'Académie Française)
- Les camerades, Éditions de La Table Ronde, 1964
- L'agonie du régime en Russie Soviétique, Éditions de La Table Ronde, 1965
- Histoire de l'armée soviétique, Plon, 1959 (A History of the Soviet Army, Pall Mall, 1966, ASIN: B0006D9TO4)
- La guerre secrète des services spéciaux français (1935-1945), Plon, 1967.

== About Michel Garder ==
- Félix Bonafé, Jean-Paul Delbert (1995). Michel Garder. Soldat résistant Franc-Maçon de tradition. ISBN 978-0000989444. ISBN 0000989444.
