= Hervé Le Bras =

French demographer and historian (born 1943)

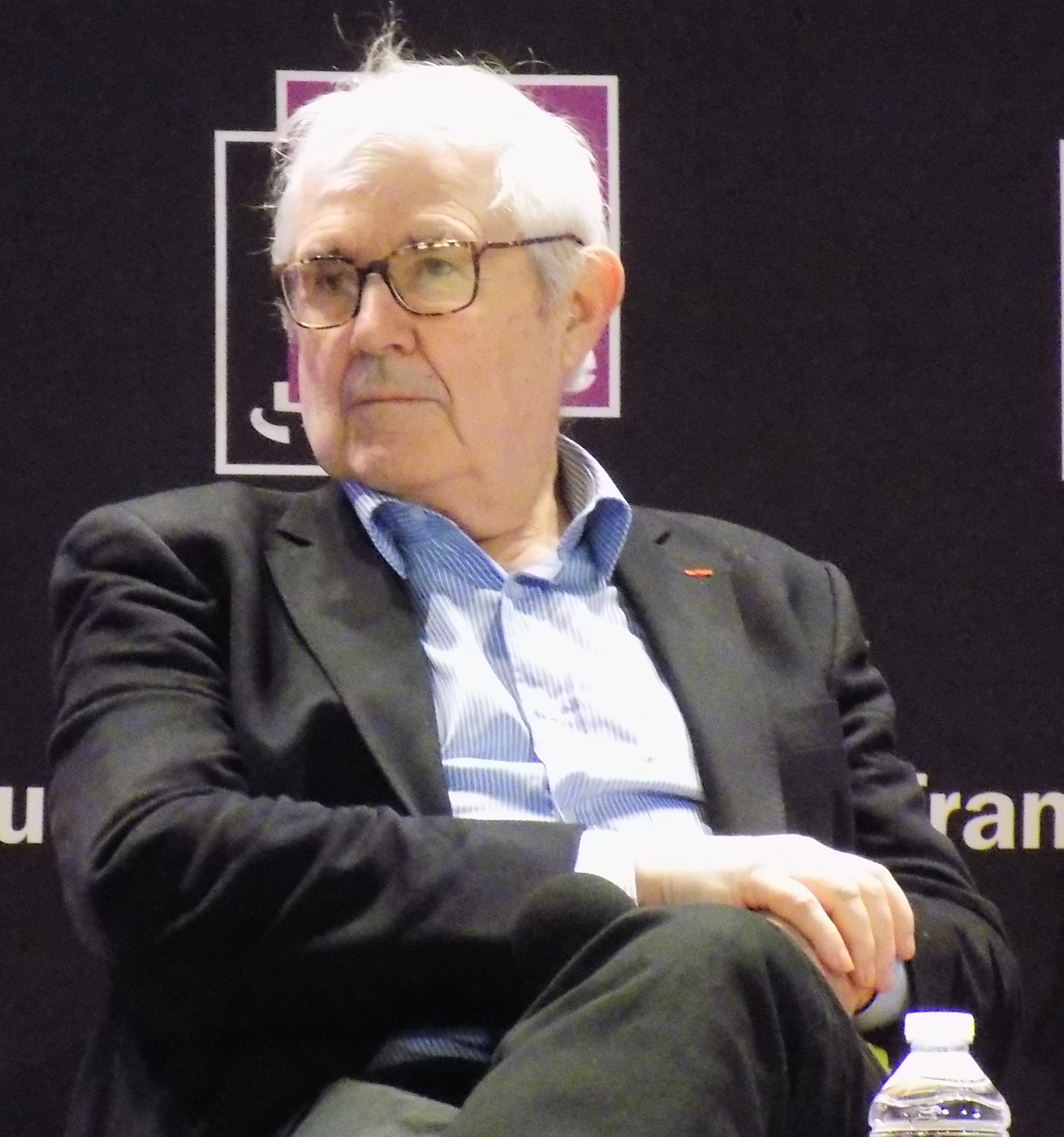
- Hervé Le Bras in 2016
- Born: 6 June 1943 (age 83); Paris, France
- Education: École polytechnique
- Occupations: Demographer; Historian; Statistician
- Employer: INED

Hervé Le Bras (born 6 June 1943) is a French demographer and historian.

== Early life ==
Hervé Le Bras was born on June 6, 1943, in Paris, France. He graduated from the École polytechnique.

== Career ==
Le Bras did an internship in anthropology in Chad from 1966 to 1967. He was a statistician in neurolinguistics at the Institut national de la santé et de la recherche médicale (INSERM) from 1967 to 1970.

Le Bras was a lecturer at his alma mater, the École Polytechnique, from 1974 to 1992 and Sciences Po from 1979 to 1990. He was also Professor of Geometry, Representation and Morphology at the École Nationale Supérieure d'Architecture de Paris-Belleville from 1969 to 1990. He was a visiting professor at the University of Geneva in Switzerland as well as the University of Michigan and the University of Virginia in the United States.

Le Bras is an emeritus researcher at the Institut national d'études démographiques (INED) and director of research at the School for Advanced Studies in the Social Sciences (EHESS). He was a conference director at the École nationale d'administration from 2009 to 2010.

Le Bras has been a Fellow of Churchill College, University of Cambridge since 2002. He is a Knight of the Legion of Honour.

== Works ==
- Le Bras, Hervé (1986). Les trois France. Paris: Odile Jacob. ISBN 9782020091657. OCLC 15195556.
- Le Bras, Hervé (1991). Marianne et les lapins : l'obsession démographique. Paris: Odile Jacob. ISBN 9782855656335. OCLC 25787412.
- Le Bras, Hervé; Labbé, Morgane (1993). La planète au village : migrations et peuplement en France. La Tour d'Aigues: Editions de l'Aube. ISBN 9782876781238. OCLC 77423715.
- Le Bras, Hervé (1994). Les limites de la planète : mythes de la nature et de la population. Paris: Flammarion. ISBN 9782080668776. OCLC 32392254.
- Le Bras, Hervé (1996). Le peuplement de l'Europe. Paris: Documentation française. ISBN 9782110035806. OCLC 397992996.
- Le Bras, Hervé (1998). Le démon des origines : démographie et extrême droite. La Tour-d'Aigues: Editions de l'Aube. ISBN 9782876784185. OCLC 406041905.
- Le Bras, Hervé (1999). Le sol et le sang : théories de l'invasion au XXe siècle. La Tour d'Aigues: Editions de l'Aube. ISBN 9782876784703. OCLC 41238626.
- Le Bras, Hervé (2000). Naissance de la mortalité : l'origine politique de la statistique et de la démographie. Paris: Gallimard. ISBN 9782020406444. OCLC 301644722.
- Le Bras, Hervé (2000). Essai de géométrie sociale. Paris: Odile Jacob. ISBN 9782738107800. OCLC 468044652.
- Arthus-Bertrand, Yann; Le Bras, Hervé (2000). 365 jours pour la terre. Paris: Editions de La Martinière. ISBN 9782732426600. OCLC 490939847.
- Le Bras, Hervé (2002). Une autre France : votes, réseaux de relations et classes sociales. Paris: Odile Jacob. ISBN 9782738112095. OCLC 401648593.
- Duhamel, Alain; Le Bras, Hervé; Defarges, Philippe Moreau; Houziaux, Alain (2005). L'Europe jusqu'où?. Paris: Editions de l'Atelier. ISBN 9782708237902. OCLC 420114230.
- Le Bras, Hervé (2005). La démographie. Paris: Odile Jacob. ISBN 9782738111814. OCLC 300277326.
- Le Bras, Hervé; Lang, Jack (2006). Immigration positive. Paris: Odile Jacob. ISBN 9782738118011. OCLC 421070118.
- Le Bras, Hervé; Ténédos, Julien (2006). Entre deux pôles : la démographie, entre science et politique. La Courneuve: Aux lieux d'être. ISBN 9782916063201. OCLC 470559995.
- Le Bras, Hervé (2007). Les 4 mystères de la population française. Paris: Odile Jacob. ISBN 9782738118752. OCLC 300407890.
- Le Bras, Hervé (2008). Contre le conservatisme démographique français : quatre essais sur la population actuelle de la France. Suresnes: En temps réel. ISBN 9782915897180. OCLC 470721734.
- Le Bras, Hervé (2009). Vie et mort de la population mondiale. Paris: Éditions Le Pommier. ISBN 9782746504295. OCLC 495198420.
- Le Bras, Hervé; Dumont, Gérard-François (2009). Doit-on contrôler l'immigration ?. Bordeaux: Éditions Prométhée. ISBN 9782916623054. OCLC 495200748.
- Le Bras, Hervé; Todd, Emmanuel (2012). L'invention de la France : atlas anthropologique et politique. Paris: Gallimard. ISBN 9782070136438. OCLC 782105343.
- Le Bras, Hervé; Todd, Emmanuel (2015). Le mystère français. Paris: Seuil. ISBN 9782021102161. OCLC 842461318.
- Le Bras, Hervé (2015). Le pari du FN. Paris: Éditions Autrement. ISBN 9782746741263. OCLC 926050123.
- Le Bras, Hervé (2016). Anatomie sociale de la France : ce que les big data disent de nous. Paris: Robert Laffont. ISBN 9782735121038. OCLC 946581479.
