= Kristofer Allerfeldt =

British historian

Kristofer Allerfeldt is a British historian and farmer. He teaches History at the University of Exeter.

== Background ==
The Allerfeldt family, originally from Sweden, lived and farmed at Yarner House on Dartmoor.

== Career ==
Allerfeldt's research focuses on the history of racism, nationalism and organised crime in the United States, and the creation of modern American society. He is an occasional political and cultural commentator for The Independent.

His published work has explored subjects such as the KKK, the Progressive Era, and U.S. deportation policy.

In 2024, he published the first history of the Ku Klux Klan from ‘its origins in post-Civil War Tennessee to the present day’.

== Selected works ==
- Race, Radicalism, Religion and Restriction: Immigration in the Pacific Northwest, 1890-1924. Praeger, 2003
- Beyond the Huddled Masses: American Immigration and the Treaty of Versailles. IB Tauris, 2006
- The Progressive Era in the USA 1890 - 1921. Ashgate, 2007
- Crime and the Rise of Modern America. Routledge, 2011
- Organized Crime in the United States, 1865-1941. McFarland, 2018
- The Ku Klux Klan: An American History. The History Press, 2024
