= Andrei Amalrik =

Russian writer (1938–1980)

Andrei Alekseevich Amalrik
- Андрей Алексеевич Амальрик
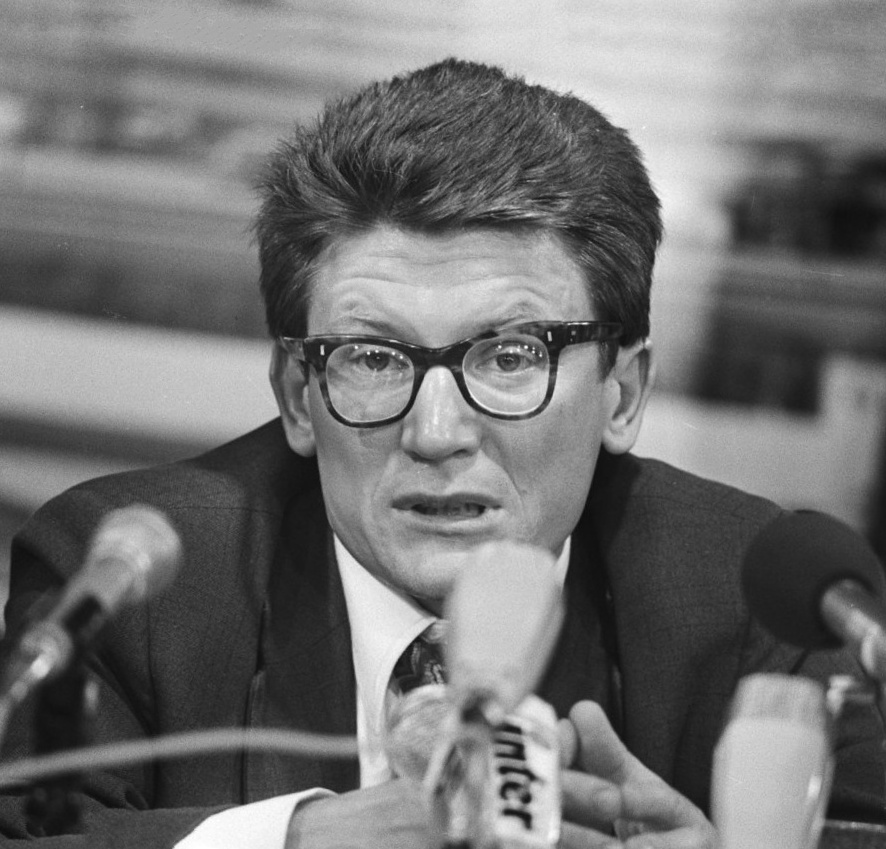
- Andrei Amalrik at a press conference in the Netherlands, 15 July 1976
- Born: May 12, 1938; Moscow
- Died: November 12, 1980 (aged 42); Guadalajara, Castile-La Mancha, Spain
- Education: Moscow State University
- Occupations: historian, journalist, dissident
- Spouse: Gyuzel Makudinova (1942-2014)
- Writing career
- Genre: history
- Notable works: Involuntary Journey to Siberia; Will the Soviet Union Survive Until 1984?
- Movement: the dissident movement in the Soviet Union

Signature
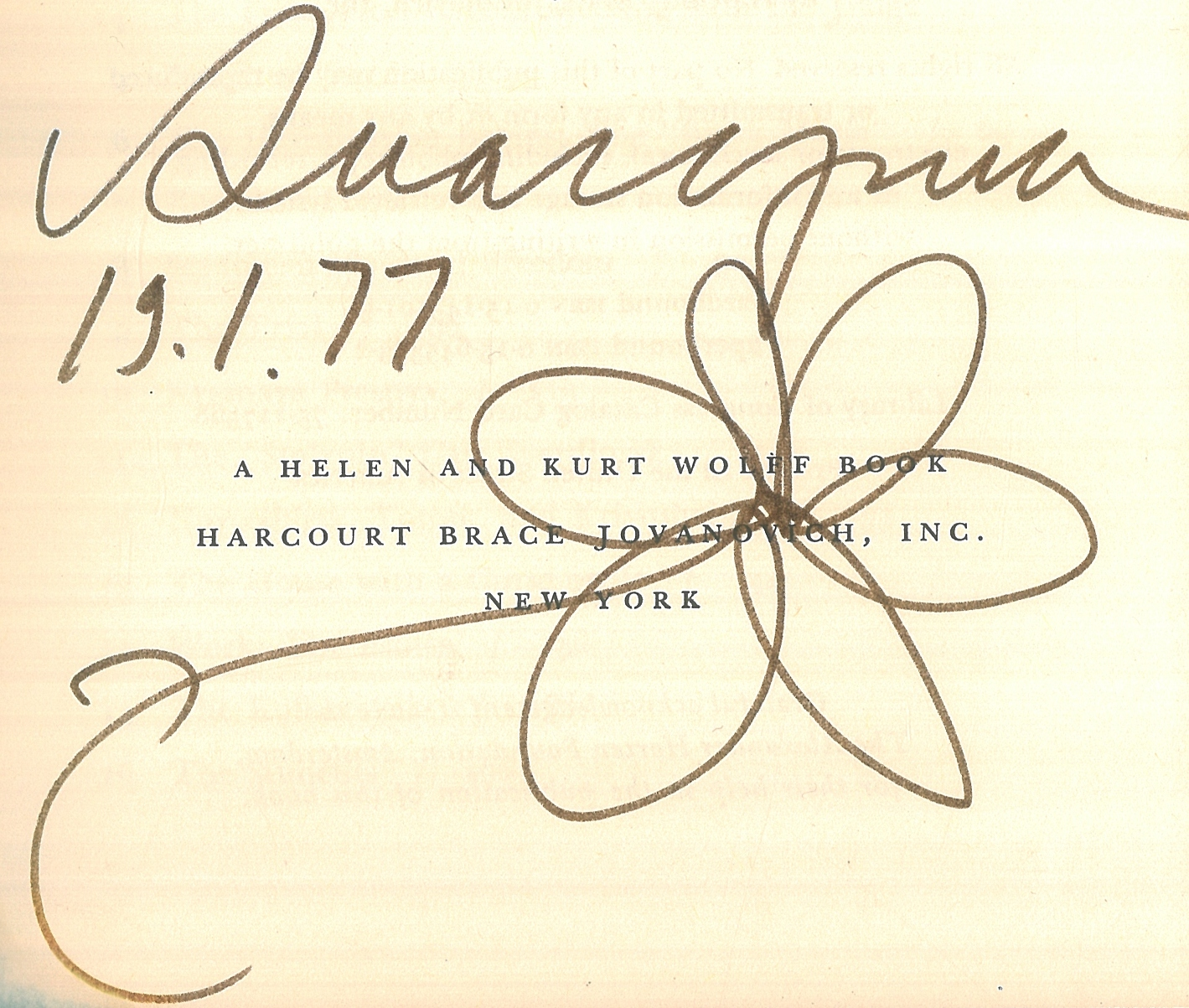

Andrei Alekseevich Amalrik (Russian: Андре́й Алексе́евич Ама́льрик, 12 May 1938, Moscow – 12 November 1980, Guadalajara, Castile-La Mancha, Spain), alternatively spelled Andrei or Andrey, was a Soviet writer and dissident.

Amalrik was best known in the Western world for his 1970 essay, Will the Soviet Union Survive Until 1984?.

== Early life ==
Amalrik was born in Moscow, during the time of Joseph Stalin's purges.

When the Soviet revolution broke out, Andrei's father, then a young man, volunteered for the Red Army. After the war he went into the film industry. Andrei's father fought in World War II in the Northern Fleet and then the Red Army. He was overheard uttering negative views about Stalin's qualities as a military leader, which led to his arrest and imprisonment; he feared for his life, but shortly afterward was released to rejoin the army. In 1942 he was wounded at Stalingrad and invalided out of the service. Andrei's father's hardships explain Andrei's decision to become a historian. For his father, after climbing the educational ladder, was after the war refused permission to study at the Academy of Sciences' Institute of History on account of what authorities felt was his own compromised political past. But as historian John Keep wrote: "Andrei has gone one better by not only writing history but by securing a place in it."

Andrei's father developed a serious heart condition which required constant nursing. This care was provided first by his wife, and on her death from cancer in 1959 by his son Andrei, until Andrei's arrest prevented him from ministering to his father's needs. He died when Andrei was in prison.

In high school, Andrei Amalrik was a restless student and truant. He was expelled a year before graduation. Despite this, he won admission to the history department at Moscow State University in 1959.

In 1963, he angered the university with a dissertation suggesting that Scandinavian warrior-traders (Vikings, usually called Varangians in Russia) and Greeks, rather than Slavs, played the principal role in developing the early Russian state in the ninth century. Amalrik refused to modify his views and was expelled from Moscow University.

== First prison sentence ==
Without a degree, Amalrik did odd jobs and wrote five unpublished plays but was soon under the gaze of the security police for an attempt to contact a Danish scholar through the Danish Embassy. He also became close to the unofficial youth literary group SMOG. Amalrik's plays and an interest in modern non-representational art led to Amalrik's first arrest in May 1965. A charge of spreading pornography failed because the expert witnesses called by the prosecution refused to give the needed testimony. However, the authorities then accused Amalrik of "parasitism," and he was sentenced by an administrative tribunal to banishment in western Siberia for a two-and-a-half-year term.

He was freed briefly and then rearrested and sent to exile in a farm village near Tomsk, in Siberia. Allowed to make a brief trip to Moscow after the death of his father, Amalrik persuaded Tatar expressionist artist, Gyuzel Makudinova, to marry him and share his exile.

It was this exile he described in Involuntary Journey to Siberia (1970). Thanks to the efforts of his lawyer, his sentence was overturned in 1966 and Amalrik returned to Moscow, moving with Gyuzel into a crowded communal apartment with shared bath, kitchen, and telephone.

== Protest at trial ==
During the trial of writers Andrei Sinyavsky and Yuli Daniel in February 1966, Amalrik and other dissenters stood outside of the trial to protest.

Amalrik often met with foreign correspondents to relay protests, took part in vigils outside courthouses and even gave an interview to an American television reporter.

In June 1966, after being released early from exile, Amalrik returned to Moscow. He got a job as a freelancer at the Novosti Press Agency. This work allowed him to create a circle of acquaintances among foreign correspondents. He handed over to a foreign correspondent the "Memorandum" of Andrei Sakharov. Amalrik was published abroad. Together with Pavel Litvinov, he wrote the collection "Trial of the Four" about the trial of Alexander Ginzburg, Yuri Galanskov, Alexey Dobrovolsky, and Vera Lashkova. In October 1968, he gave the collection to foreign correspondents, with whom he talked a lot. At the end of 1968, he was fired from Novosti and began working as a postman.

After the invasion of Czechoslovakia in 1968, pressure on Russia's intellectuals was stepped up by the authorities. Amalrik's apartment was twice searched, in May 1969 and February 1970.

== Will the Soviet Union Survive Until 1984? ==
Amalrik was best known in the Western world for his essay Will the Soviet Union Survive Until 1984?, published in 1970. The book predicts the country's eventual breakup under the weight of social and ethnic antagonisms and a disastrous war with China. This was in direct contrast to Andrei Sakharov's famous essay "Reflections on Progress, Peaceful Coexistence, and Intellectual Freedom", published only two years before, which argued that a convergence between Soviet and western systems was already taking place, while Amalrik's essay argued that the two systems were in fact growing further apart.

The essay was written following the Damanskii/Zhenbao island incident with China. The essay envisions that Sino-Soviet border conflicts would escalate and that "These skirmishes will be escalated into total war at the moment most suitable to China." Taking advantage of the USSR's over-extended military forces, Germany would unite and the Eastern European countries would assert various territorial demands and break away. Nationalism and separatism would increase in the non-Russian peoples of the Soviet Union, and new states would develop in the border regions.

Writing in 1969, Amalrik originally wanted to make 1980 as the date of the Soviet downfall, because 1980 was a round number, but Amalrik was persuaded by a friend to change it to the Orwellian inspired year of 1984. Amalrik predicted the collapse of the regime would occur between 1980 and 1985.

Amalrik said in his book:

I must emphasize that my essay is based not on scholarly research but only on observation. From an academic point of view, it may appear to be only empty chatter. But for Western students of the Soviet Union, at any rate, this discussion should have the same interest that a fish would have for an ichthyologist if it suddenly began to talk.

Amalrik was incorrect in some of his predictions, such as a coming military collision with China, and the collapse of the Soviet Union occurred in 1991, not 1984. Correct was his argument that:

If...one views the present "liberalization" as the growing decrepitude of the regime rather than its regeneration, then the logical result will be its death, which will be followed by anarchy."

Amalrik predicted that when the breakup of the Soviet empire came, it would take one of two forms. Either power would pass to extremist elements and the country would "disintegrate into anarchy, violence, and intense national hatred," or the end would come peacefully and lead to a federation like the British Commonwealth or the European Common Market.

As 1984 drew nearer, Amalrik revised the timetable but still predicted that the Soviet Union would eventually collapse.

=== U.S. reaction ===
Predictions of the Soviet Union's impending demise were discounted by many, if not most, Western academic specialists, and had little impact on mainstream Sovietology. "Amalrik's essay was welcomed as a piece of brilliant literature in the West" but "[v]irtually no one tended to take it at face value as a piece of political prediction."

=== Soviet reaction ===
Soviet dissident Natan Sharansky described that "in 1984 KGB officials, on coming to me in prison" when Amalrik's essay was mentioned, "laughed at this prediction. 'Amalrik is long dead', they said, 'but we are still very much present.'"

=== Post-USSR views ===
Of those few who foresaw the fall of the Soviet Union, including Andrei Amalrik, author Walter Laqueur argued in 1995 that they were largely accidental prophets, possessors of both brilliant insight into the regime's weaknesses and even more brilliant luck.

On an essay published in Foreign Affairs, Charles King called Amalrik's predictions "deserving of an award", praising his logical method for exploring the historical outcomes that arise from a nation's tendency to bet in its own prolonged stability — "to consider, for a moment, how some future historian might recast implausible concerns as inevitable ones.", as well as his insight into what the post-Soviet geopolitic scenario would look like. King argues that, while Amalrik was wrong about the likelihood of conflict with China, the Soviet–Afghan War played out perfectly as a stand-in for what Amalrik predicted: "a drawn-out, exhausting war, prosecuted by decrepit leaders, which drained the Soviet government of resources and legitimacy".

== Second prison sentence ==
For several months after the publication of Will the Soviet Union Survive Until 1984? (1970) and Involuntary Journey to Siberia (August 1970), abroad, a criminal offence under Soviet law, Amalrik remained free to walk the streets of Moscow and to associate with foreigners.

Inevitably, for "defaming the Soviet state", Amalrik was arrested on May 21, 1970 and convicted on November 12, receiving a sentence of three years in a labor camp in Kolyma. At the end of his term, he was given three more years, but because of his poor health (he almost died of meningitis) and protests from the West, the sentence was commuted after one year to exile in the same region. After serving a five-year term, he returned to Moscow in 1975. Although the Amalriks were not Jewish, the authorities tried to persuade him and his wife to apply for visas to Israel, the common channel for emigration from the Soviet Union; they refused. On September 13, 1975, Amalrik was arrested again. The police captain told his wife that he was arrested for not having permission to live in Moscow; he could have faced a fine or up to one year in prison for violating Soviet passport regulations.

In early 1976, Amalrik and other dissidents conceived the idea of the Moscow Helsinki Group; it was formed in May 1976.

== Exile ==
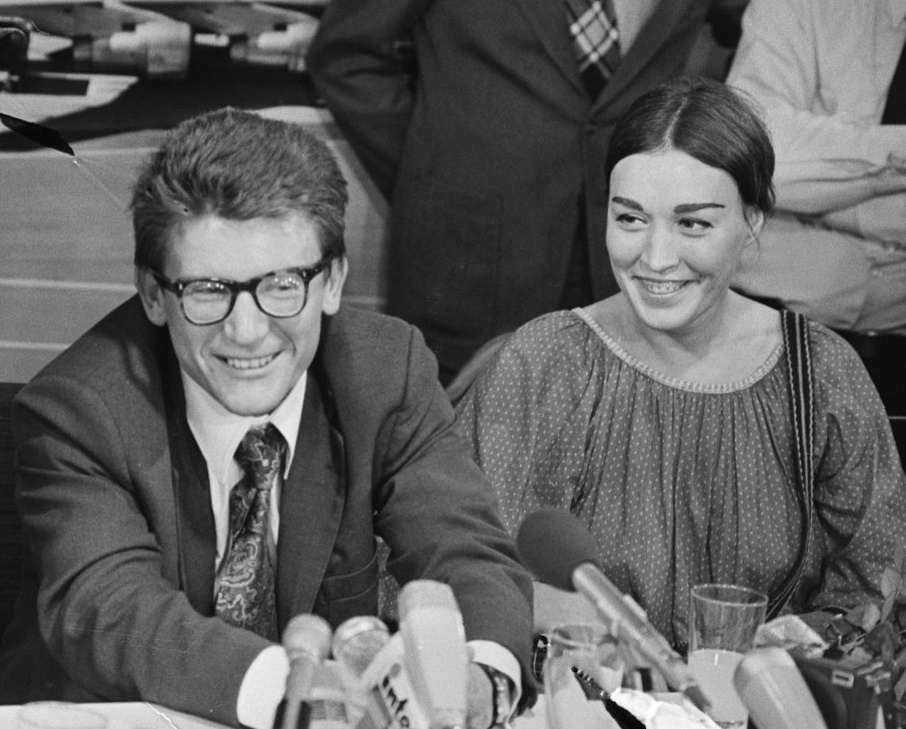
Andrei Amalrik with his wife, artist Gyuzel Makudinova, at a press conference in the Netherlands, 1976

The KGB gave Amalrik an ultimatum: to emigrate or face another sentence. In 1976 his family got visas to go to the Netherlands. He made a farewell tour of Russia before emigrating.

Amalrik worked in the Netherlands at the Utrecht University, then moved to the United States to study and lecture. Later, he and Gyuzel bought a villa in France, near the Swiss border, where he worked on his book, Notebooks of a Revolutionary.

He scorned détente with the Soviet Union. He urged that Western trade and technology be linked to liberalization within the Soviet Union.

== Death ==
On November 12, 1980, Amalrik, his wife, and two other Soviet exiles, Vladimir Borisov and Viktor Fainberg, were on their way to Madrid to attend an East-West conference called to review the Helsinki Accords of 1975. "Spanish police stated that Amalrik, coming from southern France, swerved out of his lane on a wet road near the city of Guadalajara and his car struck an oncoming truck. Mr. Amalrik was instantly killed by a piece of metal, probably from the steering column, which was embedded in his throat, according to the police. His widow, Gyuzel, received only slight injuries," as did the two other passengers.

== Timeline ==
Life of Andrei Amalrik
Early life
| 1938; Born in Moscow | 1959; Admitted to the history department at Moscow University in 1959 | 1963; Expelled from Moscow State University |
Dissent
| 1965; First prison sentence | 1966; Sentence overturned, returned to Moscow | 1966; February; Protest at Trial. | 1970; Published two books abroad |
| 1970 November; Second prison sentence | 1975; Returns to Moscow after sentence | 1975; September 13; Arrested again for illegally living in Moscow |
Exile
| 1976; Exiled to Netherlands | | 1980; Died in a car crash |

== Quotes ==
- In Russian history, man has always been a means but never an end

=== Quotes from Will the Soviet Union Survive Until 1984? ===
- "There is another powerful factor which works against the chance of any kind of peaceful reconstruction and which is equally negative for all levels of society: this is the extreme isolation in which the regime has placed both society and itself. This isolation has not only separated the regime from society, and all sectors of society from each other, but also put the country in extreme isolation from the rest of the world. This isolation has created for all—from the bureaucratic elite to the lowest social levels—an almost surrealistic picture of the world and of their place in it. Yet the longer this state of affairs helps to perpetuate the status quo, the more rapid and decisive will be its collapse when confrontation with reality becomes inevitable."
- "...any state forced to devote so much of its energies to physically and psychologically controlling millions of its own subjects could not survive indefinitely."

=== Quote from "Notes of a Revolutionary" ===
- "We had left a great country that we both loved and hated. Could it really be that we would never return?"
- "Even when examining the subject most critically, I do not regard the Russians as a hopeless people, for whom slavery is a natural mode of existence. ... I can see that in the authoritarian stream of Russian history there is an undercurrent, sometimes strong, of a sense of law."

Before being exiled, Amalrik made a pilgrimage to those places where, in the 14th century, Muscovy was born. Standing before the UNESCO-listed complex of wooden churches of Kizhi Pogost on the banks of Lake Onega, he felt a stab of wonderment: "How could one and the same people have created such churches and destroyed so many of them in blind rage?"

== Books and articles ==
Books

- Andrej Amalrik (1970). Sopravviverà l'Unione Sovietica fino al 1984? [Will the USSR survive until 1984?] (PDF) (in Italian). Rome, Amsterdam: Coines edizioni spa, Alexander Herzen Foundation. Archived (PDF) from the original on March 5, 2016.
- Amalrik, Andrei (1971). Involuntary Journey to Siberia. Mariner Books. ISBN 978-0156453936.
- Amalrik, Andrei (1973). Nose! Nose? No–Se and Other Plays. Harcourt. ISBN 978-0156673501.
- Amalrik, Andrei (1980). Journal d'un provocateur [Diary of a provocateur] (in French). Paris: Seuil. ISBN 978-2020057042.
- Amalrik, Andrei (1982). Записки диссидента [Dissident's Notes] (in Russian). Анн Арбор: Ардис.
- Amalrik, Andrei (1982). Notes of a Revolutionary. Translated by Daniels, Gay. Alfred A. Knopf. ISBN 978-0-394-41756-1.

Articles

- Amalrik, Andrei (Autumn 1969). "Will the USSR survive until 1984?". Survey: 47–79.
- Amalrik, Andrei (Winter–Spring 1970). "Open letter to Kuznetsov". Survey: 95–101.
- Amalrik, Andrei (Winter–Spring 1970). "I want to be understood correctly". Survey: 102–109.
- Amalrik, Andrei (Autumn 1970). "Interview". Survey: 128–135.
- Amalrik, Andrei (March 25, 1971). "News from Moscow". The New York Review of Books.
- Amalrik, Andrei (Spring 1976). "Ideologies in Soviet society". Survey: 1–11.
- Amalrik, Andrei (Summer–Autumn 1976). "Europe and the Soviet Union". Survey: 11–12.
- Amalrik, Andrei; Brumberg, Abraham (June 1977). "A conversation with Andrei Amalrik". Encounter: 30–31.
- Alexeyeva, Lyudmila; Bukovsky, Vladimir; Amalrik, Andrei; Voikhanskaya, Marina; Plyushch, Leonid; Elina, Emilia; Voronina, Lidia; Bresenden, Yevgeniy (November 1977). "The Orlov tribunal". Index on Censorship. 6 (6): 52–60. doi:10.1080/03064227708532716. S2CID 143045934.
- Amalrik, Andrei; Bukovsky, Vladimir; Filip, Ota; Kolakowski, Leszek; Pelikán, Jiří; Schöpflin, George; Tökes, Rudolf (November 1977). "Is détente working?". Index on Censorship. 6 (6): 44–51. doi:10.1080/03064227708532715. S2CID 220930497.
- Amalrik, Andrei (June 1978). "The Grigorenko papers: writings by General P. G. Grigorenko and documents on his case". Slavic Review. 37 (2): 316–317. doi:10.2307/2497633. JSTOR 2497633.
- Alexeyeva, Lyudmila; Grigorenko, Pyotr; Amalrik, Andrei; Kaminskaya, Dina; Simes, Konstantin; Williams, Nikolai; Litvinov, Pavel; Litvinova, Maya; Sadomskaya, Natalya; Chalidze, Valery; Shragin, Boris; Stain, Yuri (2013) [1978]. "В защиту Анатолия Марченко" [In defense of Anatoly Marchenko]. Kontinent (in Russian). 152.
- Amalrik, Andrei (March 1, 1978). "Soviet dissidents and the American press: a reply". Columbia Journalism Review. 16 (6): 63.
- Amalrik, Andrei (May 1979). "Victims of Yalta". Harper's Monthly: 91–94.
