= Jonathan Hopkin =

Jonathan Hopkin is Professor in the European Institute and the Department of Government of the London School of Economics and Political Science. He obtained a PhD at the European University Institute in Florence, and lectured at the Universities of Bradford, Durham and Birmingham, joining LSE in 2004. He teaches comparative politics and political economy, and has published in the areas of political parties and elections, political economy, inequality and welfare states.

Hopkin has worked mainly on the development of political parties in contemporary Spain and Italy. His current research, with Mark Blyth of Brown University, examines the reasons for the narrowing of the range of political choices in advanced democracies, a process conceptualized as "cartelization". In 2020, he published a book with Oxford University Press, Anti-System Politics: The Crisis of Market Liberalism in Rich Democracies.

== Anti-System Politics ==
In the introduction Hopkin writes that in the context of politics, term "anti-system" was introduced by political scientist Giovanni Sartori in the 1960s in reference to political parties that expressed opposition to the political order of liberal Western democracies.
