= Sales and operations planning =

Integrated business management process

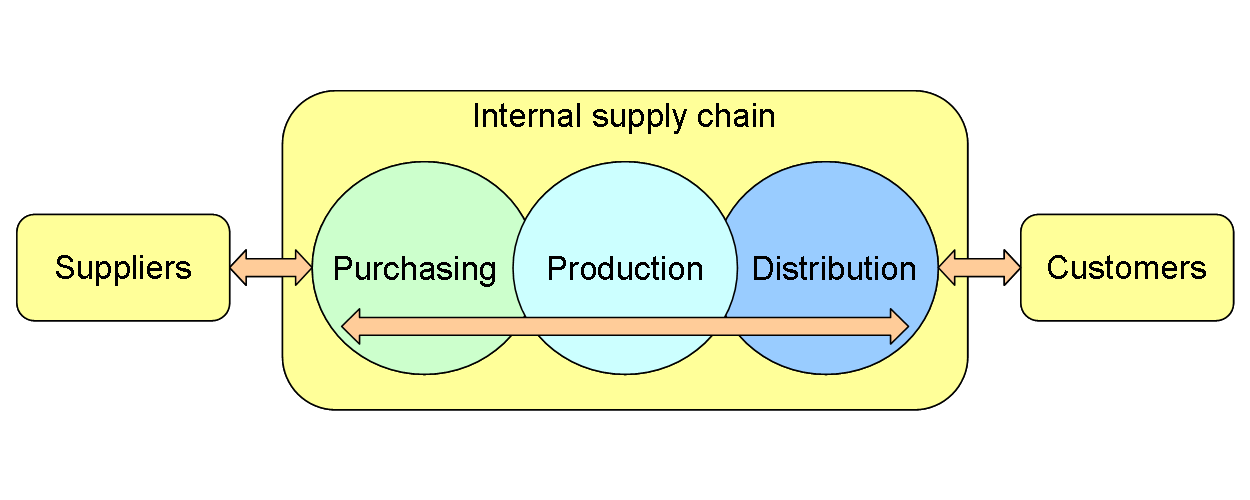
Integration between the departments, with suppliers and customers.

Sales and operations planning (S&OP) is a business management planning process that integrates demand forecasting with supply planning to create a plan that attempts to balance demand with available resources.

The process brings together sales operations, production capacity, inventory levels, and budgets so that different parts of the company work from the same assumptions. These plans are reviewed and updated as conditions change.

When using S&OP, managers compare expected customer demand with available supply to understand how the business is performing at a given time and what is likely to happen next.

S&OP is intended to facilitate better supply chain management.

== Definitions ==
S&OP was developed with the concept of aggregated production planning (APP) in the first part of the 1950s, then switched to manufacturing resource planning (MRP 2) around 1985, until the current definition of business process for the alignment of supply and demand. The term S&OP and its modern meaning were conceived in the 1980s and are generally attributed to Richard Ling, then a consultant with the management consulting firm Oliver Wight.

APICS defines S&OP as the "function of setting the overall level of manufacturing output (production plan) and other activities to best satisfy the current planned levels of sales (sales plan and/or forecasts), while meeting general business objectives of profitability, productivity, competitive customer lead times, etc., as expressed in the overall business plan." The Institute for Supply Management defines it as "working cross-functionally with internal business units to forecast anticipated demand, inventory, supply, and customer lead times based on the sales forecast, actual demand, and capacity forecast." One of its primary purposes is to establish production rates that will achieve management's objective of maintaining, raising, or lowering inventories or backlogs, while usually attempting to keep the workforce relatively stable. It must extend through a planning horizon sufficient to plan the labor, equipment, facilities, materials, and finances required to accomplish the production plan. As this plan affects many company functions, it is normally prepared with information from marketing, manufacturing, engineering, finance, materials, etc."

It has also been described as "a set of decision-making processes to balance demand and supply, to integrate financial planning and operational planning, and to link high-level strategic plans with day-to-day operations."

== Planning process ==
S&OP is the result of planning activities, and it is composed of 5 main steps: data gathering, demand planning, supply planning, pre-meeting, and executive meeting with the addition of a preliminary step at the beginning (event plans), two additional steps at the end of the process in case of a multinational company (global roll-up and global executive meeting) and revision as the conclusive step of the S&OP cycle.

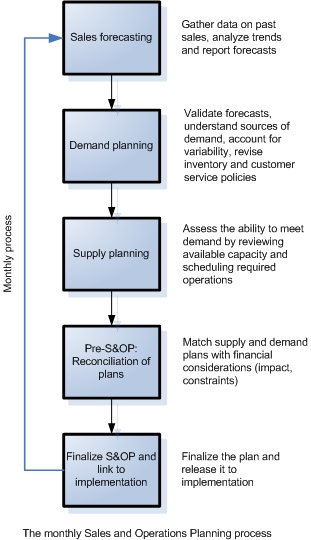
A cycle of S&OP Process.

It is a tactical process with a planning horizon that covers up to 18 months at the product family level (or SKU) and it is typically performed monthly (or driven by events in case it is used as a tool to respond quickly to the uncertainty of the context).

While S&OP is often viewed as a balancing of supply and demand of "goods," these principles can also be applied to businesses dealing exclusively with services.

== Inputs to S&OP ==
The inputs are related to the plans of the different departments involved in S&OP, including constraints and goals. The inputs could be:

- demand plans, forecasts, and impacts
- marketing and sales actions,
- procurement and supply plans,
- supplier lead time and constraints
- supply and production capacity
- inventory, work-force, and operational constraints
- production lead time, flexibility, and contingencies
- distribution plans and capacity
- lead time for the delivery and transportation status
- service level targets, constraints, or budgets.

== Output of S&OP ==
The main output from S&OP is the integration of the plans of Marketing, Sales, Operations and Finance. The integration of plans is allowed by the cross-functional integration fostered by S&OP. The integration is different from coordination: in fact, it takes into consideration the target, while the coordination takes it for granted. To achieve the integration, the main precursors are informational quality (the information for the decisions are appropriate in terms of content and form), procedural quality (the rules at stake are clear for all the departments involved), alignment quality (the synchronization of goals and actions), and constructive engagement (the participants are proactive in the process and defend their interests. A high level of constructive engagement often leads to a greater level of S&OP effectiveness).

== Goals of S&OP ==
The goals of S&OP can be classified into these categories: alignment and integration, operational improvement (improvement of operational performance, improved forecast accuracy), results focused on a single perspective (for instance, improve supply chain performance, improve customer service), results based on trade-offs (for example, optimize customer service versus inventory) and end results (such as gross profit and contribution margins). Many authors, including Patrick Bower have written on how S&OP creates value in the supply chain.

== Implementation ==
The implementation is driven by the maturity model of S&OP. There are different maturity models proposed in the literature as a function of the type and number of dimensions (mechanisms) considered and the type and number of stages of evolvement. These models serve three purposes: descriptive for the implementation, prescriptive (to understand which is the current state and which are the following stages to be reached), and comparative (to benchmark the maturity stage of the company versus the competitors).

One maturity model described in academic literature includes five dimensions and five stages. The five dimensions are related to: meetings and collaboration, organization, measurement, information technology and S&OP plan integration. The stages, along with these dimensions, evolved to be one S&OP process (stage 1), reactive (stage 2), standard (stage 3), advanced (stage 4) and proactive (stage 5).

Another maturity model suggests four dimensions and six stages of evolution. These dimensions are process effectiveness (in terms of how the right things are being done for S&OP), process efficiency (how things are being done right with minimum effort), people and organization, and information technology. The stages of evolution are undeveloped (level zero), rudimentary (level one), reactive (level two), consistent (level three), integrated (level four) and proactive (level five).

== Enablers and barriers ==
There are several enablers and barriers that can aid or harm S&OP implementation. Key enablers include a capacity to learn from previous mistakes, an ability to make changes, discipline, a person/team accountable for the S&OP process, top management support, cross-functional integration, performance evaluation, supportive information systems, training on S&OP, commitment of participants, well-assigned roles and responsibilities, and impartiality in the conducting of the process. The main barriers include the presence of a siloed culture, inadequate information technology, and difficulty reaching agreed cross-department decisions.

== See also ==
- Supply chain management
- CPFR
- Supply and demand
- Forecasting
- Demand chain
- Demand chain management
- Sales management
- Sales operations
