= Distro =

Distro may refer to:

- Distribution center
- Linux distribution, a specific vendor's operating system-package composed of the Linux kernel, GNU tools and libraries, additional software based on a package management system.
- A zine distribution service
