= Surround sound marketing =

Surround Sound Marketing is a term to describe the way in which a combination of marketing messages using different media formats work synergistically.

== Background ==
The term originates from research by Rex Briggs in 1997, when he was conducting exposed/control experiments with online advertising for Ford Fiesta in the UK. Even though the online ad banners had only a picture of a person blowing bubble gum and the Ford Fiesta logo, exposure to the advertisement increased perceptions of safety. "This baffled American analyst: How could this banner ad, which contained only an odd picture and the Ford logo, convince anyone that Ford is a safe car?" Digging further, Briggs learned that simultaneously, TV, print and outdoor campaign featured the same person blowing bubble gum, and explaining the safety features, including airbags. The exposure to the online advertising, Briggs concluded, was reinforcing the messaging already received in other media.

As Briggs and Stuart explain in the book What Sticks, Why Advertising Fails and How to Guarantee Yours Succeeds, the underpinnings of how surround sound marketing works is based on the idea of "imagery transfer." In 1968, researchers established that the brain will "replay" imagery when reminded of it in other forms. In What Sticks, Briggs and Stuart presents research from Unilever Dove Nutrium campaign across TV, Online and magazine that effectively uses the same core imagery to achieve "surround sound marketing" success.

Briggs and Stuart define surround sound marketing as one of the key principles of marketing success. They write, "Just as in a stereo system, one speaker doesn't do it all; instead it's the combination of the woofer, tweeter, and mid range that gives the sound a richness and quality... The same thing applies to marketing. For example, seeing an ad multiple times in the same medium can actually be less efficient than if people see a well-orchestrated advertisement in different media."

== Uses of Surround Sound Marketing ==
Surround sound marketing has become a common term in marketing over the past decade, to wit, "Pep Boys CEO Mike Odell noted the company saw a rebound in its service business in the third quarter, helped by its surround sound marketing effort, lower gas prices and pent-up demand, although the company's retail business remained soft" (as reported by Forbes). Or, from CMO.com, August 8, 2011, a story entitled Digitally Connecting Through Surround-Sound Marketing. More than 85,000 matches on Google to the phrase "surround sound marketing" illustrate the move from a research specific idea to a general marketing term.
