= Automatic box-opening technology =

Mechanical process

Automatic box-opening technology is designed to automatically open boxes on a conveyor or other "pass through" environment. The process was invented due to a gap in automation technology that exists in large distribution centers and warehouses.
