= Distribution center =

Building stocked with goods for delivery

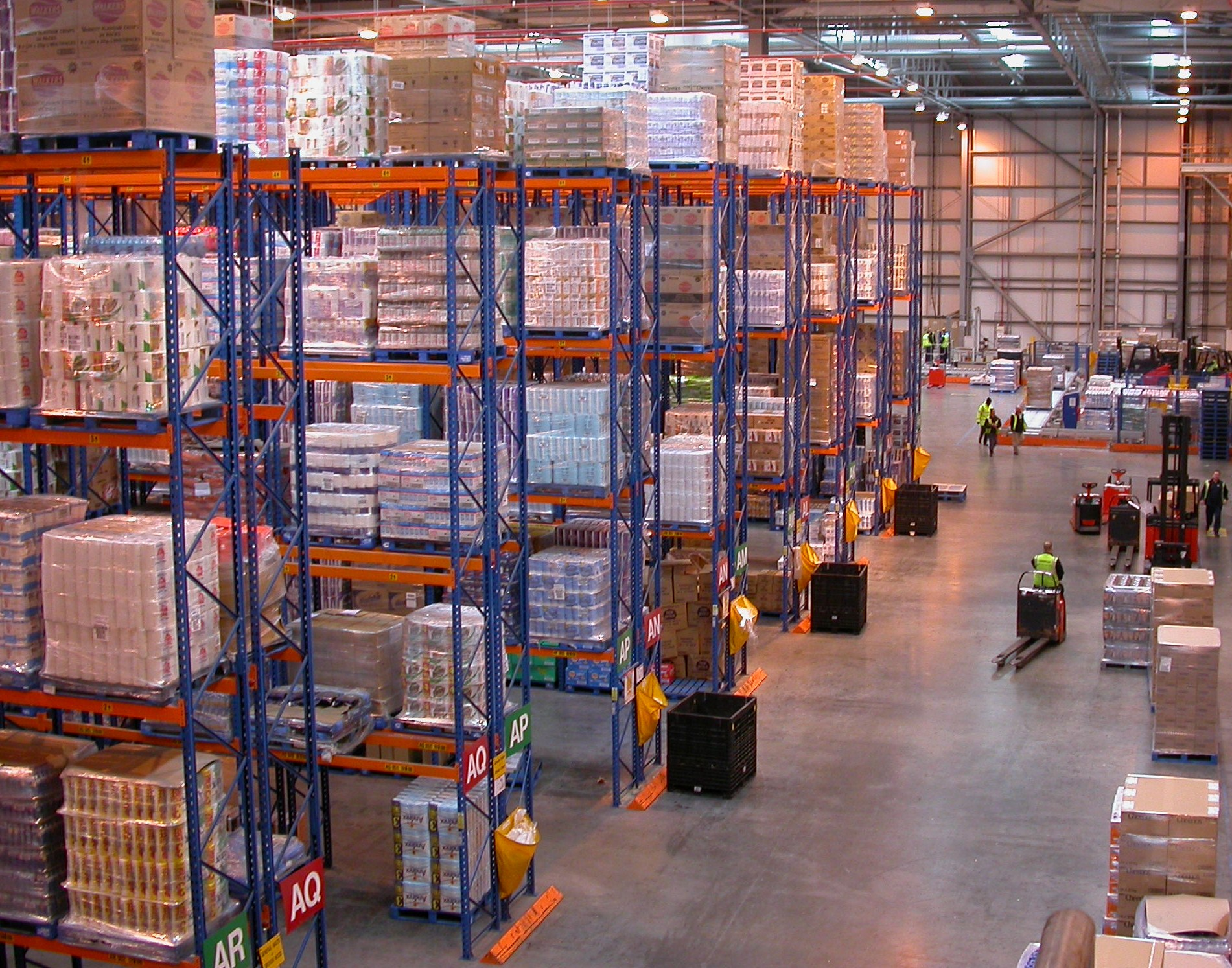
Sainsbury's distribution center in Waltham Point, Hertfordshire, United Kingdom.

A distribution center for a set of products is a warehouse or other specialized building, often with refrigeration or air conditioning, which is stocked with products (goods) to be redistributed to retailers, to wholesalers, or directly to consumers. A distribution center is a principal part, the order processing element, of the entire order fulfillment process. Distribution centers are usually thought of as being demand driven. A distribution center can also be called a warehouse, a DC, a fulfillment center, a cross-dock facility, a bulk break center, and a package handling center. The name by which the distribution center is known is commonly based on the purpose of the operation. For example, a "retail distribution center" normally distributes goods to retail stores, an "order fulfillment center" commonly distributes goods directly to consumers, and a cross-dock facility stores little or no product but distributes goods to other destinations.

Distribution centers are the foundation of a supply network, as they allow a single location to stock a vast number of products. Some organizations operate both retail distribution and direct-to-consumer out of a single facility, sharing space, equipment, labor resources, and inventory as applicable.

A typical retail distribution network operates with centers set up throughout a commercial market, with each center serving a number of stores. Large distribution centers for companies such as Walmart serve 50–125 stores. Suppliers ship truckloads of products to the distribution center, which stores the product until needed by the retail location and ships the proper quantity.

Since a large retailer might sell tens of thousands of products from thousands of vendors, it would be impossibly inefficient to ship each product directly from each vendor to each store. Many retailers own and run their own distribution networks, while smaller retailers may outsource this function to dedicated logistics firms that coordinate the distribution of products for a number of companies. A distribution center can be co-located at a logistics center.

== Scale ==
A large distribution center might receive and ship more than ten thousand truckloads each year, with an individual store receiving from only a couple of trucks per week up to 20, 30, or more per week. Distribution centers range in size from less than 50,000 square feet (5,000 m^{2}) to the largest identified in 2015 approaching 3 million square feet (300,000 m^{2}).

=== Storage locations and storage containers ===
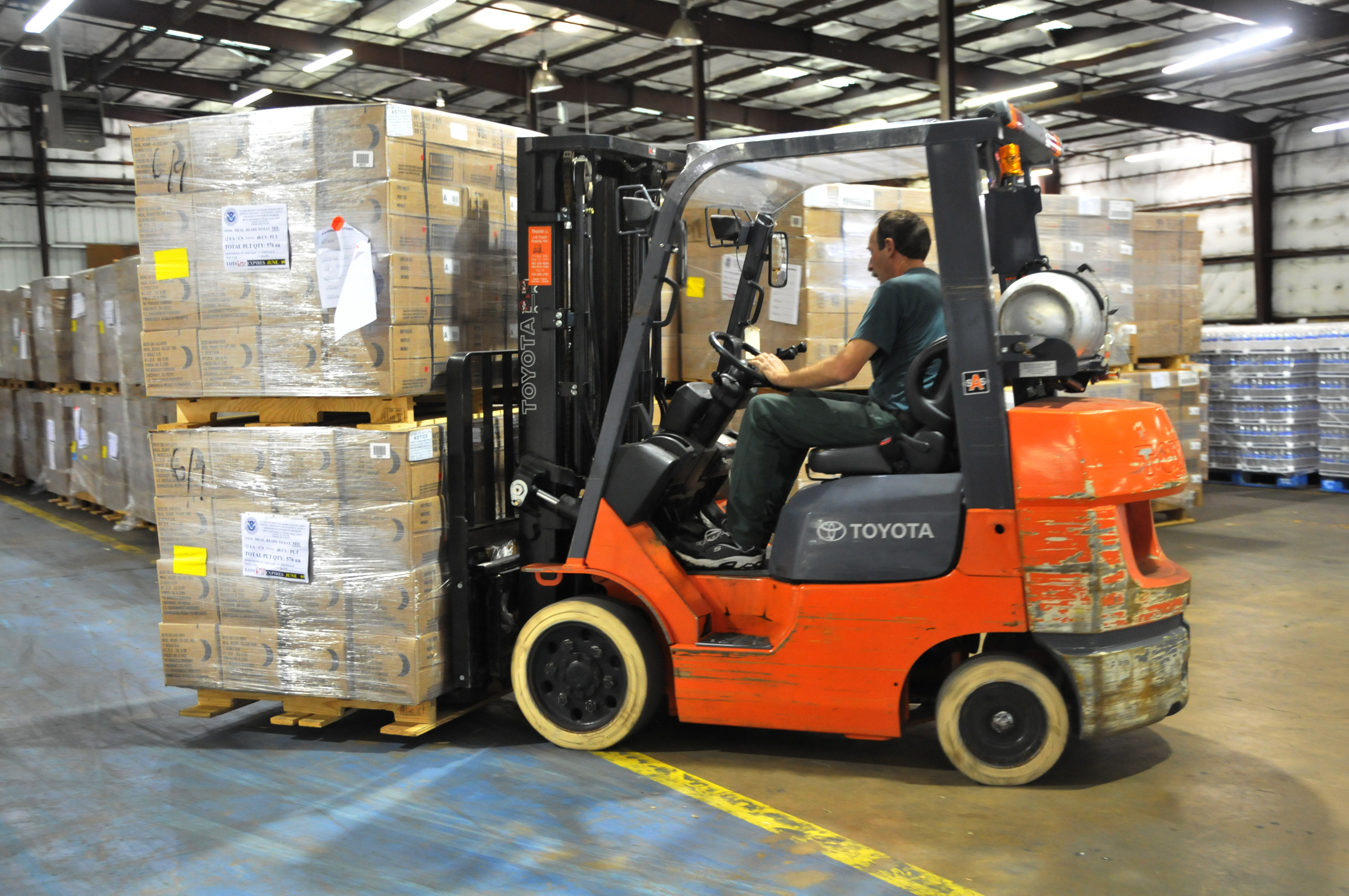
A fork lift truck moves stacked pallets

Goods (products) arrive and are stored in a distribution center in varying types of storage locations and containers suited to the product characteristics and the amount of product to be transported or stored. These types of locations and containers have specific industry-accepted names. Specialized pieces of equipment (material handling equipment, or MHE) are used to handle the various types of containers. The following is a list of some of the names and characteristics of common storage containers:

- Intermodal containers (shipping containers) are used for the efficient transportation of goods. Standards specify the volume and dimensions of containers to facilitate efficient handling.
- Pallets are one of the most commonly used means to store and move product in a distribution center. There are many specialized devices (material handling equipment or MHE) used to handle pallets - e.g. forklift truck, pallet jack, pallet inverter, unit load, and Automated Storage and Retrieval Systems (ASRS). Pallets are stored on the floor, may be stacked, and may be stored in pallet racking.
- Bulk Box are large single boxes usually connected or attached to a pallet.
- Cases and Cartons are boxes usually containing many items. In distribution centers there is a generally accepted distinction made between the terms "carton" and "case", although both are boxes. Goods are received and stored in cartons, while goods are shipped in cases. A stored carton is called a case once it has been picked or pulled for shipment.
- Totes are reusable containers used to hold and transport goods.

== Processing ==
Another way to look at a distribution center is to see it as a production or manufacturing operation. Goods arrive in bulk, they are stored until needed, retrieved, and assembled into shipments. The efficient processing of a distribution center can greatly impact the final price of the product delivered to the end user. Efficient processing not only directly impacts the cost of goods through reduced labor, but it also indirectly impacts the cost of goods through reduced inventory. Inventory represents an investment with its associated investment interest or inventory carrying cost. Reducing the processing time of order processing can directly reduce the amount of inventory necessary to be stocked in the operation (see demand chain management).

== Costs ==
The most efficient method of distribution would be to ship a full truckload or railcar directly from the manufacturer to the retailer. The next most efficient method would be to ship a full truckload to a distribution center, unload full pallets of products, and immediately load the pallets onto trucks destined for individual stores. Both of these methods can be used only on very high-volume items. Most products cannot be delivered in this manner, and pallets or even individual boxes must be broken down and divided.

Once a full pallet must be broken apart, the costs of handling the product can increase quickly. Many distribution centers use large sortation systems with miles of conveyor to move products through the facility and into a truck. They may also have automated equipment for de-palletizing and re-palletizing product. Some of the most sophisticated systems can convey product directly into storage racks and then convey out of the racks to trucks, all automatically. With a wide variety of product sizes and weights, these systems are designed to handle a specific range of products. Very large, small, heavy, or light products require varying degrees of manual handling.

As the process of handling involves more steps and becomes increasingly manualized, the cost increases. Storing products instead of receiving and immediately shipping them adds cost. Firms must determine when lost sales due to not having product on the shelves are balanced by increased handling and storage costs. Conversely, automating these additional manual steps can reduce the labor and costs associated with these processes. For example, automatic box-opening technology makes the process of opening individual boxes for re-packaging much faster.

== Organization ==
All distribution centers have three main areas and may have additional specialized areas. The three main areas are: the receiving dock, the storage area, and the shipping dock. In small organizations it is possible for the receiving and shipping functions to occur side by side, but in large centers, separating these areas simplifies the process. Many distribution centers have dedicated dock doors for each store in their shipping area. The receiving area can also be specialized based on the handling characteristics of freight being received, on whether the product is going into storage or directly to a store, or by the type of vehicle delivering the product.

== Planning ==
A number of components go into the overall planning of a distribution center in order to maximize its efficiency. If the distribution center relies on a conveyor system suspended from the ceiling, consideration needs to be given to the weight-bearing capacity of the ceiling joists. If the conveyor system runs along the floor, then consideration needs to be given in the design stage to the placement of columns, particularly as they relate to the flue space between pallet rack frames. Other planning considerations include attention to such areas as slotting, product replenishment, storage media, and power requirements.

== Safety ==
The distribution center industry is no stranger to occupational hazards and accidents, (95 people receive physical injuries in forklift accident every day in the US) which is why it has been designated as a priority industry sector in the National Occupational Research Agenda (NORA) by the National Institute for Occupational Safety and Health (NIOSH) in the United States.

To mitigate the number of accidents, it's crucial to establish a culture of safety across all levels of management within the warehouse. This means that executives and owners must enforce safety procedures and regulations to ensure a safe and productive workspace.

To achieve this goal, implementing a comprehensive safety plan that covers all areas of the warehouse and applies to all employees is paramount. Owners and managers must be willing to invest time and money towards safety measures, which should be included in the overall budget. This way, a safer working environment can be established for all those involved in the distribution center industry.

=== Simple distribution center outline ===
Because many distribution centers service both large and small clients, especially those which store a specific type of service as opposed to those which serve a specific company, roles and departments are generally more complicated. A simple distribution center which serves many clients of a specific theme or type of service may include:

- Goods in (or goods inward): Usually containing specialized container unloading equipment and workers, including pallet wrapping, conveyor belt unloaders (as used on 40 ft shipping containers), forklift drivers, and administrative staff
- Bulk: As a rule, a bulk department controls and ships larger orders or orders that contain only full cartons/boxes. A bulk department includes forklift truck drivers to load containers and wagons, and man-up or combi forklift trucks to unload full pallets from warehouse racking.
- Break-bulk: Break-bulk (also known as split case) is a lower-capacity version of the bulk department. Orders usually contain part boxes or items not requiring pallets. Due to the number of smaller customers a distribution center may serve, a break-bulk department may need more workers than a bulk department. A break-bulk department usually uses trolleys or, for palleted/heavy orders, small electric PPT or walkie low lift trucks. Items shipped by break-bulk are usually stored in pick, which are usually the bottom two pick-faces of warehouse racking. A pick-face is the space on such a racking system onto which a pallet can be loaded.
- Export: An export department controls orders which are leaving the country of the distribution center. This department is almost identical in function to a bulk or break-bulk department; however, workers in this department build pallets conforming to different standards and sizes. An export department also uses different shipping containers or haulage firms.
- Quality assurance: A quality assurance (QA) department performs periodic checks of random samples of stock to check quality, including from the warehouse racking, goods in, and returned stock. This department may also take on cycle count duties to find missing stock.
- Administration
- Packing and production: In many distribution centers it is not feasible to store stock in many different packaging styles or quantities, and while it may cost a customer more to do so, many customers, such as supermarkets, prefer their own packaging on stock. Because of this, packing benches are used to take raw items, such as a box of balloons, and pack them at a specific unit quantity, which are then packed into cartons and labeled accordingly for a customer. In many circumstances this may be more inexpensively done at a distribution center than by a customer or client.
- Transportation: Arranges and coordinates shipments in and out of the distribution center.
- Dedicated product departments: Divisions may be based on handling characteristics or storage characteristics, for example, refrigerated and non-refrigerated [meat and produce, frozen, dairy/deli, dry]. Each of these three areas have both shipping and receiving departments as well.

Distribution centers also have a variety of supporting departments, including human resources, maintenance/facilities operations, production control, and accounting.

== Sustainability ==
Modern distribution centers are increasingly focusing on energy efficiency as a key aspect of sustainable operations. The U.S. Environmental Protection Agency (EPA) suggests that improving energy efficiency in distribution centers can save up to 25% of the energy consumed. To achieve this, distribution centers are upgrading their lighting systems to energy-efficient alternatives such as LED lighting, which can save up to 75% in energy consumption. In addition, motion sensors are installed to automatically turn off lights in unoccupied areas, further reducing energy waste. The adoption of energy-efficient HVAC systems and regular maintenance can enhance efficiency and reduce energy waste, while thermal insulation of buildings helps to prevent heat transfer and reduce the load on HVAC systems. These energy-efficient strategies not only help reduce carbon emissions but also result in significant cost savings over time, with energy-efficient buildings typically using 20-30% less energy according to the U.S. Department of Energy.

Waste management is another critical component of sustainable practices in modern distribution centers. Effective waste management strategies include conducting regular waste audits to understand the types and quantities of waste produced, implementing source segregation to separate recyclables from non-recyclables, and adopting waste-to-resource conversion methods such as composting food waste or selling cardboard and paper waste to recycling companies. By engaging with suppliers to explore packaging alternatives that reduce waste generation and implementing sustainable waste management practices, distribution centers can minimize their environmental impact, reduce operational costs, and enhance their brand reputation among environmentally conscious customers. Technological advancements also play a role in optimizing waste management processes, with the implementation of waste tracking software and automated waste collection systems improving efficiency and reducing operational costs.

== Jobs ==
A distribution center typically has a general manager who manages the facility and typically has a number of department managers who report directly to him/her. Most distribution centers divide staff into two categories, direct labor and indirect labor. Direct labor staff execute the distribution processes, while indirect labor staff support the direct labor staff. Each department is in turn composed of supervisors and warehouse workers. The direct labor jobs of a warehouse can include:

- Unloader - unloads trucks and breaks down pallets as needed, using various pieces of power equipment
- Receiver - inventories and tags unloaded pallets using a mobile cart computer unit and printer
- Hauler - transports received pallets with equipment from the receiving dock to the storage racks
- Putaway driver - puts product into racks with forklift
- Lumper - helps unload shipments
- Replenishment driver - pulls product from the racks and places it into the "pick slot" with forklift
- Order filler - picks product from the "pick slot" by hand and moves with power equipment
- Loader - wraps the order-filled pallets and loads trucks, using equipment

Indirect labor departments and jobs within a warehouse can include:

- Supervision - floor (process) supervision, indirect labor supervision
- Human resources - employment office and employee benefits
- Facilities and housekeeping - maintenance of buildings
- Inventory management - tracking and placement of product
- Quality control - inspection and acceptance of incoming and outbound product
- Asset protection - building security and loss prevention
- Safety - insurance of safe operating practices
- Equipment maintenance - electrical, mechanical, and pneumatic maintenance of MHE
- Operations research - Industrial engineering, process improvement, labor standards
- Information technology - support of information systems
- Water Spider - replenishes cardboard, bubble wrap, tape, etc. for warehouse packers
