= Rex Briggs =

American writer and researcher

Rex Briggs (born 1971) is an author, award winning marketing ROI researcher. He began his career at Yankelovich Partners, where he was noted for his work in Generation X Minority marketing. While at Yankelovich, he is noted for developing a theory called “The Psychology of disenfranchisement.” Briggs was among the first to research the Internet.

Briggs is responsible for several innovations in digital marketing. In 1995, Briggs joined Wired, as Director of Research, focusing on their digital brand HotWired. He created the first study of Web banner advertising effectiveness. The research is notable because it was the first application of random sampling online, and used design of experiments to measure the in-market impact of online advertising. Briggs and his team at HotWired innovated one-to-one web marketing to deliver personalized content, and real-time web analytics, known as “HotStats”.

== Online Advertising Measurement ==
In 1997, Briggs founded MBInteractive, with Joshua Grossnickle and Oliver Raskin under the ownership of WPP plc. At MBInteractive, Briggs continued his work on marketing effectiveness creating the widely cited 1997 IAB Advertising Effectiveness Study., and inventing an early version of behavior targeting with leading online ad servers. During this period, Briggs coined the marketing terms “brand impact” and "Surround sound marketing.”

== Marketing ROI Measurement ==
In 2000, Briggs founded Marketing Evolution. At Marketing Evolution, Briggs created a new form of research called “cross media research” (now known as multi-touch attribution and unified measurement). The research, referred to as "XMOS" for a time began with The Dove Nutrium Bar study. It was the first of its kind in that it showed the ROI of online advertising side by side with Television in Magazine, and thus provided insight on the share of the marketing budget that should be devoted to Online advertising in comparison to other media. The cross-media research expanded to other brands, and was publicized globally by the IAB and Microsoft, with Briggs co-presenting the results of the cross-media research with Bill Gates and Steve Ballmer at various locations around the world.

In January 2006, BusinessWeek’s cover story, entitled “Math Will Rock Your World” featured Briggs ROI marketing analysis. Later that year, Briggs expand the research connecting online advertising to offline sales and published the cross-media measurement for the Ford F-150 campaign launch.

== Book: What Sticks ==
In 2006, Briggs co-authored the book What Sticks, Why Advertising Fails and How To Guarantee Yours Succeeds (ISBN 1419584332), [Ad Age] named What Sticks the #1 book in marketing, and included Briggs among the 10 people who made their mark. Ad Age devoted a cover story to the book in August 2006. What Sticks has been widely cited for answering John Wanamaker’s quote, “Half the money I spend on advertising is wasted; the trouble is I don’t know which half.” Briggs and co-author Greg Stuart analyzed three-dozen blue-chip brand campaigns on behalf of marketing CMOs and calculated that 37 percent of advertising investment was wasted. Reasons for the waste include failure to understand underlying customer motivations for buying, ineffective messages and inefficient media mix investment (pg 19-20).

Briggs and Stuart suggestions for reducing waste in marketing were amplified by Bob Liodice, President of the Association of National Advertisers in an op-ed in Ad Age entitled "Marketers, Get Serious About Accountability. Their suggestion about improving ROI through systematic investment in innovation was emphasized by Mark Renshaw in his Ad Age op-ed entitled "The '70/20/10 Rule' and Why You Need It

What Sticks is required reading at leading Universities including Wharton School of the University of Pennsylvania and Harvard.

== Social Media ROI ==
In 2007, Briggs advanced research in social media marketing with MySpace, Adidas, and Electronic Arts. He and his team at Marketing Evolution documented what he termed "The Momentum Effect" which is the influence of friend to friend sharing of marketer's messages in social networks. His work in this area was cited in books including Emmanuel Rosen's The Anatomy of Buzz Revisited (ISBN 0385526326), and Groundswell (ISBN 1422125009), by Charlene Li and Josh Bernoff (pg 8), and The Chaos Scenario (ISBN 0984065105) by Bob Garfield.

In 2011, Briggs announced that social media effects can be predicted, and accountable like other media.

== Marketing Technology ==
Briggs has published on the topic of marketing technology and automation starting in 2000 in a paper that won an Excellence in International Research from ESOMAR. In 2011 he articulated how software to optimize budget planning forms a collective brain, and could be extended to the application of technology to proactively distribute marketing best practices in the marketing process.

Briggs argues that SIRFs (Spend to Impact Response Functions) will be the "Face of Marketing" and the integration into software will be "transformative."

== Book: SIRFs-Up: The Story of How Spend To Impact Response Functions (SIRFs), Algorithms And Software Are Changing The Face of Marketing ==
In 2012, Briggs published SIRFs-Up. Ad Age covered the book upon its release.

Part 1 explained how SIRFs have become increasingly used by marketers, starting with a case study from Victoria's Secret in the US and concluding with a case study from AB-InBev, in Latin America. Briggs explains that SIRFs represent an optimized ordering of marketing spend, and produce a diminishing a returns curve where incremental spending produces less incremental value. Part 1 briefly explains the math of measuring SIRFs, and focuses on SIRFs use in marketing measurement of Return On Investment (ROI), media planning, and business planning. Briggs uses several case studies from well known brands to illustrate the points.

Part 2 provides a marketing framework that has customer insights at the center, with content development and amplification following the customer insights. Different content and amplifications strategies are reviewed. Briggs' discusses his research findings on social media (the Momentum Effect) and the importance to marketers.

Part 3 focuses on Marketing and Media Planning. The section starts with an audit of the brands current levels of advocacy and awareness, and the "big ideal" (or brand purpose). Briggs argues that different business types need to approach marketing differently. Briggs explains that generalizations about marketing often are met with skepticism because there are significant differences in how a business should market based on the business type. For example, a business with a narrow customer base of a few hundred potential customers is vastly different than one with more than a hundred million customers. The dimensions in the Briggs-Matthews business typing tool are: 1) Marketing Led vs. Sales Led, 2) Narrow customer base vs. Broad customer base, 3) Top-dog vs. Underdog, 4) Sell through channel vs. direct, 5) Purchased frequently vs. infrequent, and 6) Left-brain (rational) vs. Right-brain (emotional) vs. No-brainer (habitual). Briggs provides a tool for companies to type themselves, and to see the implications of different types on marketing strategy and tactics.

Part 4 addresses how to use SIRFs by "renting them" from companies with impact benchmarks, or gathering your own SIRFs through primary research such as multi-touch attribution analysis.

Part 5 predicts how marketing will be transformed by technology. Briggs predicts the merging of BI (Business Intelligence) MRM (Marketing Resource Management) and EMM (Enterprise Marketing Management) as business fully integrate consumer intelligence data and SIRFs into the entirety of business operations. Briggs address the changing role humans in an increasingly technology driven field.

Part 6 is a series of case studies putting all the concepts discussed in the book to practice.
