= Advertising adstock =

Lagged effect of advertising on behavior

Advertising adstock or advertising carry-over is the prolonged or lagged effect of advertising on consumer purchase behavior. Adstock is an important component of marketing-mix models. The term "adstock" was coined by Simon Broadbent. Adstock is a model of how the response to advertising builds and decays in consumer markets. Advertising tries to expand consumption in two ways; it both reminds and teaches. It reminds in-the-market consumers in order to influence their immediate brand choice and teaches them to increase brand awareness and salience, which makes it easier for future advertising to influence brand choice. Adstock is the mathematical manifestation of this behavioral process.

The adstock theory hinges on the assumption that exposure to television advertising builds awareness in the minds of the consumers, influencing their purchase decision. Each new exposure to advertising builds awareness and this awareness will be higher if there have been recent exposures and lower if there have not been. In the absence of further exposures adstock eventually decays to negligible levels. Measuring and determining adstock, especially when developing a marketing-mix model is a key component of determining marketing effectiveness. There are two dimensions to advertising adstock:

1. decay or lagged effect.
2. saturation or diminishing returns effect.

== Advertising lag: decay effect ==
The underlying theory of adstock is that the exposure to television advertising builds awareness in the consumer markets, resulting in sales. Each new exposure to advertising increases awareness to a new level. The decay effect of adstock eventually reduces awareness to its base level, unless or until this decay is reduced by new exposures. This decay effect can be mathematically modelled and is usually expressed in terms of the ‘half-life’ of the advertising. A ‘two-week half-life’ means that it takes two weeks for the awareness of advertising to decay to half its present level. Every Ad copy is assumed to have a unique half-life. Some academic studies have suggested a half-life range of around 7– 12 weeks, while industry practitioners typically report half- lives between 2–5 weeks, with the average for Fast Moving Consumer Goods (FMCG) Brands at 2.5 weeks. Adstock half-life can be estimated through a distributed lag model response with lags of the TV Gross Ratings Point (GRP) variable, using Least Squares.

Simple Decay-Effect Model:

Below is a simple formulation of the basic Adstock model:

$A_t = T_t + \lambda A_{t-1},\;\; t=1,...,n$

Where A_{t} is the Adstock at time t, T_{t} is the value of the advertising variable at time t, and λ is the ‘decay’ or lag weight parameter. The Inclusion of the A_{t-1} term imparts an infinite lag structure to this model, with the effect of the first Adstock term approaching 0, as t tends to ∞.

This is a simple decay model, because it captures only the dynamic effect of advertising, not the diminishing returns effect.

== Advertising saturation: diminishing returns effect ==
Increasing the amount of advertising increases the percentage of the audience reached by the advertising, hence increasing demand, but a linear increase in the advertising exposure doesn't have a similar linear effect on demand. Typically, each incremental amount of advertising causes a progressively lesser effect on demand increase. This is advertising saturation. Saturation only occurs above a threshold level that can be determined by Adstock Analysis.

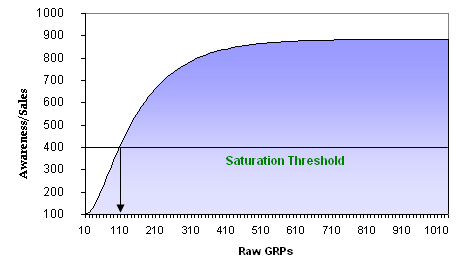

For example, for the ad copy in the above graph, advertising saturation is achieved above 110 GRPs per week.

Adstock can be transformed to an appropriate nonlinear form like the logistic or negative exponential distribution, depending upon the type of diminishing returns or ‘saturation’ effect the response function is believed to follow.

== Campaign carry-over ==
The advertising carryover effect is a famous and debated effect of business marketing practices. Essentially, the carryover theory states that the positive benefits from advertising, especially increased sales, are not perfectly in step with advertising movements but rather delayed and spread out over time so that changes may not be noticeable immediately or measurable right after the advertising strategy has gone into effect. Carryover (measured from the end of a campaign) ranges between 3 weeks and 6 months. This establishes that consumer involvement has a noticeably positive impact on carry-over, as involved consumers have a better memory for commercials. Studies show long and expensive campaigns, result in competitive clutter, when several brands advertise simultaneously, competitive interference depreciates campaign accessibility and makes individuals forget the message more quickly. Observations show noticeable wear-out effects as carry-overs are shortened when brands air multiple campaigns and/or increase the size of their advertising budget. These results are noteworthy because they show that advertising intensity, competitive interference and wear-out effects have impacts on advertising effectiveness. The negative impacts of campaign carryovers include:

- Analysis Difficulty: A campaign carryover effect makes it very difficult to analyze the success of a marketing campaign. Businesses have to choose a time period after the advertising to gauge the effects on sales by comparing it to a previous period. But if the effects are delayed, the business does not know when to start the period or how long to make it for the most accurate result. Market forces, price changes and other factors will change sales themselves if the company waits too long to make its analysis.
- Advertising Problems: Advertising problems can be resolved if they are quickly dealt with. Some problems, however, can be subtle and if the carryover effect exists, the company may not even be aware of the problem until it is too late to fix it. If positive results are delayed, so are issues with advertising strategy that could otherwise be repaired. This leaves very little room for mistakes.
- Changing Markets: Many types of advertising are based on rapidly changing markets. Trends can shift suddenly, problems can arise and create the need for marketing solutions, and other changes can make it necessary to update or replace advertising very quickly. But if the carryover effect exists, then the original gains that the advertising plan generated may not have occurred yet before it is changed, leading to essential blindness when it comes to measuring ad effectiveness.
