= Return on marketing investment =

Marketing concept

Return on marketing investment (ROMI), or marketing return on investment (MROI), is the contribution to profit attributable to marketing (net of marketing spending), divided by the marketing 'invested' or risked. ROMI is not like the other 'return-on-investment' (ROI) metrics because marketing is not the same kind of investment. Instead of money that is 'tied' up in plants and inventories (often considered capital expenditure or CAPEX), marketing funds are typically 'risked'. Marketing spending is typically expensed in the current period (operational expenditure or OPEX).

The idea of measuring the market's response in terms of sales and profits is not new, but terms such as marketing ROI and ROMI are used more frequently now than in past periods. Usually, marketing spending will be deemed justified if the ROMI is positive. In a survey of nearly 200 senior marketing managers, nearly half responded that they found the ROMI metric very useful.

The purpose of ROMI is to measure the degree to which spending on marketing contributes to profits. Marketers are under more and more pressure to "show a return" on their activities.

== History ==
The ROMI concept first came to prominence in the 1990s. The phrase "return on marketing investment" became more widespread in the next decade following the publication of two books: Return on Marketing Investment by Guy Powell (2002) and Marketing ROI by James Lenskold (2003). In the book What Sticks: Why Advertising Fails And How To Guarantee Yours Succeeds, Rex Briggs suggested the term "ROMO" for Return-On-Marketing-Objective, to reflect the idea that marketing campaigns may have a range of objectives, where the return is not immediate sales or profits. For example, a marketing campaign may aim to change the perception of a brand.

== Construction ==
Return on Marketing Investment (ROMI) =
[Incremental Revenue Attributable to Marketing ($) * Contribution Margin (%) - Marketing Spending ($)] /
Marketing Spending ($)

A necessary step in calculating ROMI is the measurement and eventual estimation of the incremental sales attributed to marketing, or simply 'incrementality'. These incremental sales can be 'total' sales attributable to marketing or 'marginal.'

== Incremental ROI ==
=== Incremental vs. Attributed Revenue ===
A critical distinction in marketing measurement is between incremental revenue and attributed revenue. Incremental revenue refers to the sales that would not have occurred without the marketing intervention—the true causal effect of marketing spending. This is measured by comparing outcomes between a treatment group (exposed to marketing) and a control group (not exposed), typically through randomized experiments. In contrast, attributed revenue simply assigns credit to marketing touchpoints based on correlation, without establishing causality. Attribution models may credit marketing for conversions that would have happened anyway, leading to inflated ROI estimates.

=== Measurement Challenges ===
Measuring true incremental ROI is substantially more difficult than it appears, due to fundamental statistical challenges. Lewis and Rao (2015) demonstrated that even well-designed randomized experiments often fail to produce precise estimates of advertising returns. Their analysis of online advertising experiments found that the median confidence interval for ROI exceeded 100% of the point estimate, meaning that even when an experiment suggests a positive return, the true ROI could plausibly range from strongly negative to many times the estimated value.

This measurement challenge stems from high variance in purchasing behavior combined with relatively small effect sizes for most marketing interventions. Even massive experiments involving hundreds of thousands of users often lack sufficient statistical power to distinguish between, for example, a 5% and 15% lift in conversions. As Lewis and Rao note, obtaining precise incremental ROI estimates would require experiments of impractical scale—often involving millions of participants—making it economically unfeasible for most organizations to achieve the level of precision commonly assumed in marketing dashboards.

=== Short-Term vs. Long-Term Effects ===
Marketing measurement approaches differ in their ability to capture short-term versus long-term effects. Marketing Mix Modeling (MMM) techniques can estimate longer-term brand-building effects and delayed conversions by analyzing historical data across multiple touchpoints and time periods. These models help quantify how sustained marketing presence builds brand equity and influences purchase decisions over weeks or months.

In contrast, incrementality testing through randomized experiments excels at measuring short-term causal lift but typically cannot capture delayed or indirect effects. McKinsey's full-funnel measurement guidance recommends using both approaches in combination: MMM for understanding the total long-term impact of marketing investments across the customer journey, and incrementality testing to validate the immediate causal effects of specific campaigns or channels. This dual approach helps marketers avoid both the attribution bias of simplistic models and the statistical imprecision challenges identified by Lewis and Rao.

== Methodologies ==
There are two forms of the Return on Marketing Investment (ROMI) metric.

=== Short Term ===
The first, short-term ROMI, is also used as a simple index measuring the dollars of revenue (or market share, contribution margin or other desired outputs) for every dollar of marketing spent.

For example, if a company spends $100,000 on a direct mail piece and it delivers $500,000 in incremental revenue, then the ROMI factor is 5.0. If the incremental contribution margin for that $500,000 in revenue is 60%, then the margin ROMI (the incremental margin for $100,000 of marketing spent) is $300,000 (= $500,000 x 60%). Of which, the $100,000 spent on direct mail advertising will be subtracted and the difference will be divided by the same $100,000. Every dollar expended in direct mail advertising translates to an additional $2 on the company's bottom line.

The value of the first ROMI is in its simplicity. In most cases a simple determination of revenue per dollar spent for each marketing activity can be sufficient to help make important decisions to improve the entire marketing mix.

The most common short-term approach to measuring ROMI is by applying Marketing Mix Modeling techniques to separate out the incremental sales effects of marketing investment.

=== Long Term ===
In a similar way the second ROMI concept, long-term ROMI can be used to determine other less tangible aspects of marketing effectiveness. For example, ROMI could be used to determine the incremental value of marketing as it pertains to increased brand awareness, consideration or purchase intent. In this way both the longer-term value of marketing activities (incremental brand awareness, etc.) and the shorter-term revenue and profit can be determined. This is a sophisticated metric that balances marketing and business analytics and is used increasingly by many of the world's leading organizations (Hewlett-Packard and Procter & Gamble to name two) to measure the economic (that is, cash-flow derived) benefits created by marketing investments. For many other organizations, this method offers a way to prioritize investments and allocate marketing and other resources on a formalized basis.

Long-term ROMI models will often draw on Customer lifetime value models to demonstrate the long-term value of incremental customer acquisition or reduced churn rate. Some more sophisticated Marketing Mix Modeling approaches include multi-year long-term ROMI by including CLV type analysis. CLV has been used as input to ROMI calculations in some academic works.

Long-term ROMI models have sometimes used brand valuation techniques to measure how building a brand with marketing spend can create balance sheet value for brands. The ISO 10668 standard sets out the appropriate process of valuing brands and sets out six key requirements: transparency, validity, reliability, sufficiency, objectivity, and financial, behavioural and legal parameters. Brand valuation is distinguished from brand equity by placing a money value on a brand, and in this way a ROMI can be calculated.

Note: No return on marketing investment methodologies have been independently audited by the Marketing Accountability Standards Board (MASB) according to MMAP (Marketing Metric Audit Protocol).

== Cautions ==
Direct measures of the short-term variant of ROMI are often criticized as only including the direct impact of marketing activities without including the long-term brand building value of any communication inserted into the market.

Short-term ROMI is best employed as a tool to determine marketing effectiveness to help steer investments from less productive activities to those that are more productive. It is a simple tool to gauge the success of measurable marketing activities against various marketing objectives (e.g., incremental revenue, brand awareness or brand equity). With this knowledge, marketing investments can be redirected away from under-performing activities to better performing marketing media.

Long-term ROMI is often criticized as a "silo-in-the-making"—it is intensively data driven and creates a challenge for firms that are not used to working business analytics into the marketing analytics that typically determine resource allocation decisions. Long-term ROMI, however, is a sophisticated measure used by a number of firms interested in getting to the bottom of value for money challenges often posed by competing brand managers.

However, it is often unclear exactly what it means to 'show a return' on marketing investment. "Certainly, marketing spending is not an 'investment' in the usual sense of the word. There is usually no tangible asset and often not even a predictable (quantifiable) result to show for the spending, but marketers still want to emphasize that their activities contribute to financial health. Some might argue that marketing should be considered an expense and the focus should be on whether it is a necessary expense. Marketers believe that many of their activities generate lasting results and therefore should be considered 'investments' in the future of the business."

== ROMI in Digital ==
The difficulty of measuring ROMI varies across mediums. Results of a North American survey show the ROI associated with one-way, traditional media (e.g. television and radio) is more difficult to measure than interactive, web-based digital media such as permission-based email marketing or social media marketing.

With the rise in Digital Marketing, the opportunity is available for marketers, or even business owners to run rough calculations of what their approximate ROI may be for their campaigns, before they even start investing.

Based from statistical research, and all things being equal, the business owner can calculate their current Digital Marketing ROI via their website and web analytics software to understand their:

- Current Traffic
- Conversion Rate
- Average Sale

Add in readily available information on potential traffic from the Google Keyword Tool, and surveyed costs to acquire that traffic, the business owner or marketer can estimate the potential ROI if that traffic is acquired, and even measure it against other marketing methods.

== See also ==
- Demand chain
- Marketing
- Marketing Strategy
- Marketing Mix
- Marketing Management
- Marketing Mix Modeling
- Marketing Plan
- Strategic Management
- Strategic Planning
- Marketing Effectiveness
