= Psychology of disenfranchisement =

The psychology of disenfranchisement is a theory developed by Rex Briggs while studying minority groups at social research firm Yankelovich Partners. Originally published by Yankelovich Partners, Grant Lukenbill's book, Untold Millions, applied the theory to help explain marketing opportunities to gays and lesbians. In Brigg's original research, he observed higher levels of stress, skepticism and self-protection needs among minority groups.

The psychology of disenfranchisement theory suggests that there are three components that drive the psychology of disenfranchisement: alienation, cynicism and perceived victimization. These components interact and intensify each other. Alienation, Briggs argues, may be due to negative perceptions, stereotypes and discrimination condoned and practiced by the dominant culture. The perception of separation from the mainstream culture can create severe stress and can be considered the impetus for the psychology of disenfranchisement. Cynicism is one of the inevitable offshoots of alienation, resulting in the conviction that things will go wrong, that harm is to be expected. It involves a sense that the institutions of society (from which one is alienated) are not only remote, but inimical. Victimization is the feeling that develops out of the perception of intentional or unintentional undeserved mistreatment by other individuals, organizations, or institutions. Victimization is a logical outgrowth of feelings of cynicism and alienation from the dominant culture. The perceived victimization legitimizes and justifies the cynicism, and over time this cycle can become entrenched, thereby increasing the feelings of alienation.

The resulting needs include: self-understanding (recognition of and respect for one's individuality), association (a sharing of occasions with "people like me"), security (emotional, social and psychical), independence, stress relief (self-indulgence, escapism).

All the Rage: The Story of Gay Visibility in America cites Briggs' psychology of disenfranchisement theory as a launching point to discuss how advertising can offer inclusion in its messaging, so as to resonate better.

In 2006, Steven Andrew Culpepper summarized Dubois 1903 book, Sols of Black Folk as capturing the essence of a double-consciousness, a paradoxical experience of deep psychic atrocity tracing from slavery, "while the American experience resonates with a hopeful ethos characterized by universality of equality and justice for all." Culpepper applies this same psychology of disenfranchisement to women, "that were severely excluded from its rights and privileges in society that touts equality and justice."

A more literal use of the concept, "psychology of disenfranchisement" has been applied by Keven Lanning where he examines the consequences to both the person and the community when individuals do not have equal access, or equal voices, at the polls.
