= Marketing mix modeling =

Estimation of the impact of marketing tactics on sales

Marketing mix modeling (MMM) is a statistical causal inference and forecasting methodology used to estimate the impact of various marketing tactics on product sales. MMMs use statistical models, such as multivariate regressions, and use sales and marketing time-series data. They are often used to optimize advertising mix and promotional tactics with respect to sales, revenue, or profit to maximize their return on investment.

Using these statistical techniques allows marketers to account for advertising ad stock and advertising's diminishing return over time, and also to account for carry-over effects and impact of past advertisements on the current sales campaign. Moreover, MMMs are able to calculate the magnitude of product cannibalization and halo effect.

The techniques were developed by specialized consulting companies along with academics and were first applied to consumer packaged goods, since manufacturers of those goods had access to accurate data on sales and marketing support. Improved availability of data, massively greater computing power, and the pressure to measure and optimize marketing spend has driven an increase in popularity as a marketing tool.

== History ==
Underlying MMMs is the concept of marketing mix, which is defined as the set of variables that a company can change to meet the demands of their customers. The term was developed by Neil Borden, who claims to have started using the phrase in around 1949 for his teaching and writing. He credits his colleague James Culliton for the idea of a "marketing mix" from portraying an executive as the following:

An executive is a mixer of ingredients, who sometimes follows a recipe as he goes along, sometimes adapts a recipe to the ingredients immediately available, and sometimes experiments with or invents ingredients no one else has tried.

Moreover, according to Borden, the marketing manager has to "weigh the behavioral forces and then juggle marketing elements in his mix with a keen eye on the resources with which he has to work."

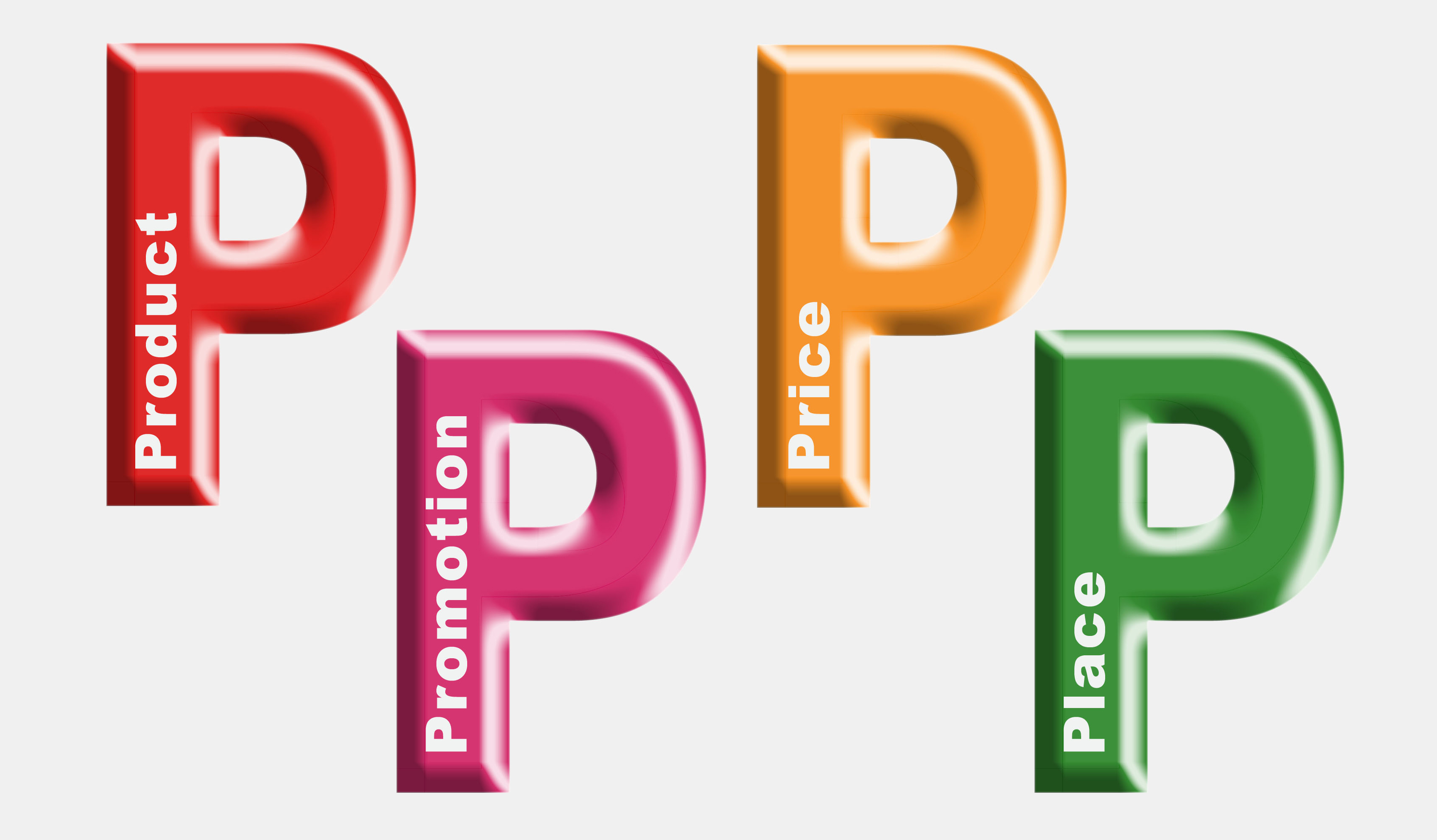
The 4Ps have been the cornerstone of the managerial approach to marketing since the 1960s

These marketing mix "ingredients" were further described by E. Jerome McCarthy, who was first to suggest the four P's of marketing:

- price,
- promotion,
- product and
- place (distribution).

According to McCarthy, the marketers essentially have these four variables which they can use while creating a marketing plan and strategy. In the long term, all four of the mix variables can be changed, but in the short term, it is difficult to modify the product or the distribution channel.

In the 1980s, Bernard Booms and Mary Bitner built a model consisting of seven P's. They added "people" to the list of existing variables, in order to recognize the importance of the human element in all aspects of marketing. They added "process" to reflect the fact that services, unlike physical products, are experienced as a process at the time that they are purchased.

== Model specifications ==
Marketing mix modeling (MMM) is an analytical approach that uses historical data to quantify impact of marketing activities on sales. Example information that can be used are syndicated point-of-sale data (aggregated collection of product retail sales activity across a chosen set of parameters, like category of product or geographic market) and companies’ internal data. Mathematically, this is done by establishing a simultaneous relation of various marketing activities with sales using a linear or a non-linear regression equation. MMM defines the effectiveness of each of the marketing elements by its contribution to sales-volume, effectiveness (volume generated by each unit of effort), efficiency (sales volume generated divided by cost), and return on investment (ROI). These insights help adjust marketing tactics and strategies, optimize the marketing spend, and forecast sales while simulating various scenarios.

The output can be used to analyze the impact of the marketing elements on various dimensions. The contribution of each element as a percentage of the total plotted year on year is an indicator of how the effectiveness of various elements changes over time. The yearly change in contribution is also measured by a due-to analysis which shows what percentage of the change in total sales is attributable to each of the elements. For activities like television advertising and trade promotions, more sophisticated analysis like effectiveness can be carried out. This analysis tells the marketing manager the incremental gain in sales that can be obtained by increasing the respective marketing element by one unit, or incrementality. If detailed spend information per activity is available, then it is possible to calculate the ROI of the marketing activity. Not only is this useful for reporting the historical effectiveness of the activity, but it also helps in optimizing the marketing budget by identifying the most and least efficient marketing activities.

Once the final model is ready, the results from it can be used to simulate marketing scenarios for a ‘What-if’ analysis. The marketing managers can reallocate this marketing budget in different proportions and see the direct impact on sales/value. They can optimize the budget by allocating spends to those activities which give the highest return on investment.

=== Model components ===
An MMM is set up with a statistical model with the sales volume/value as the dependent variable while the independent variables are the various marketing efforts. The model decomposes total sales into two components:

- Base sales – the natural demand or default sales for the product driven by economic based driver factors, like pricing, distribution, long-term trends, and seasonality if no advertisements were used. These factors also include qualitative factors like brand awareness and brand loyalty.
- Incremental sales – sales driven by marketing and promotional activities. This component can be further decomposed into incremental drivers of sales due to each marketing component like television advertising, radio advertising, print advertising (magazines, newspapers), coupons, direct mail, internet, feature or display promotions and temporary price reductions. Some of these activities have short-term returns (coupons, promotions), while others have longer term returns (TV, radio, magazine, print).

Marketing-mix analyses are typically carried out using linear regression modeling. Nonlinear and lagged effects are included using techniques like advertising adstock transformations. Typical output of such analyses includes a decomposition of total annual sales into contributions from each marketing component, like a contribution pie-chart. Once the variables are created, multiple iterations are carried out to create a model which explains the volume/value trends well. Further validations are carried out, either by using a validation data, or by the consistency of the business results.

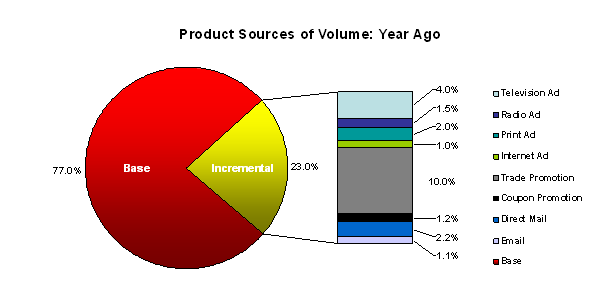
Example contribution pie and stacked bar chart for an imaginary product from a year ago.

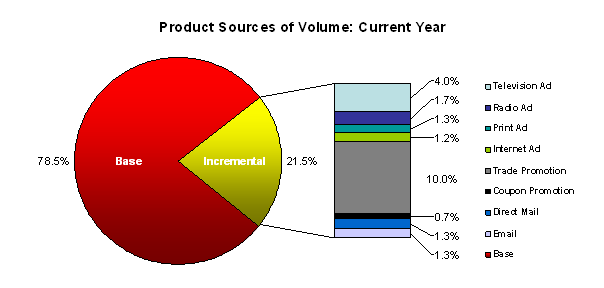
Example contribution pie and stacked bar chart for an imaginary product from the current year.

Another standard output is a decomposition of year-over year sales growth and decline ("due-to charts").

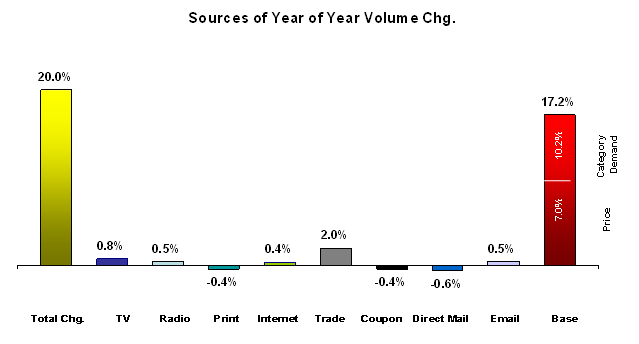
Example bar chart breakdown for volume of change by different marketing sources.

=== Elements measured in MMM ===
==== Base and incremental volume ====
The decomposition of sales volume into base (volume that would be generated in absence of any marketing activity) and incremental (volume generated by marketing activities in the short run) across time can isolate the variation in the base volume as an indicator of brand strength and customer loyalty.

==== Media and advertising ====
Marketing mix modeling can determine the sales impact generated by individual media such as television, magazine, and online display ads. In some cases it can be used to determine the impact of individual advertising campaigns or even ad executions upon sales. For example, for TV advertising activity, it is possible to examine how each ad execution's market performance impacted sales volume. MMM can also provide information on TV correlations at different media weight levels, as measured by gross rating points (GRP) in relation to sales volume response within a time frame, be it a week or a month. Information can also be gained on the minimum level of GRPs (threshold limit) in a week that need to be aired in order to make an impact, and conversely, the level of GRPs at which the impact on volume becomes saturated, i.e. further activity does not have any payback. While not all MMMs can definitively answer all questions, some additional areas in which insights can sometimes be gained include: 1) the effectiveness of 15-second vis-à-vis 30-second executions; 2) comparisons in ad performance when run during prime-time vis-à-vis off-prime-time dayparts; 3) comparisons into the direct and the halo effect of TV activity across various products or sub-brands. The role of new-product- and equity-based TV activity in growing the brand can also be compared. GRPs are converted into reach (i.e. GRPs are divided by the average frequency to get the percentage of people actually watching the advertisement). This is a better measure for modeling TV.

==== Trade promotions ====
Trade promotion is a key activity in every marketing plan. It is aimed at increasing sales in the short term by employing promotion schemes which effectively increases the customer awareness of the business and its products. The response of consumers to trade promotions is not straightforward and is the subject of much debate. Non-linear models exist to simulate the response. Using MMM we can understand the impact of trade promotion at generating incremental volumes. It is possible to obtain an estimate of the volume generated per promotion event in each of the different retail outlets by region. This way we can identify the most and least effective trade channels. If detailed spend information is available, we can compare the Return on Investment of various trade activities like Every Day Low Price, Off-Shelf Display. We can use this information to optimize the trade plan by choosing the most effective trade channels and targeting the most effective promotion activity.

==== Pricing ====
Price increases of the brand impact the sales volume negatively. This effect can be captured through modeling the price in MMM. The model provides the price elasticity of the brand which tells us the percentage change in the sales for each percentage change in price. Using this, the marketing manager can evaluate the impact of a price change decision.

==== Distribution ====
For the element of distribution, we can know how the volume will move by changing distribution efforts or, in other words, by each percentage shift in the width or the depth of distribution. This can be identified specifically for each channel and even for each kind of outlet for off-take sales. In view of these insights, the distribution efforts can be prioritized for each channel or store-type to get the maximum out of the same. A recent study of a laundry brand showed that the incremental volume through 1% more presence in a neighborhood Kirana store is 180% greater than that through 1% more presence in a supermarket. Based upon the cost of such efforts, managers identified the right channel to invest more for distribution.

==== Launches ====
When a new product is launched, the associated publicity and promotions typically results in higher volume generation than expected. This extra volume cannot be completely captured in the model using the existing variables. Often special variables to capture this incremental effect of launches are used. The combined contribution of these variables and that of the marketing effort associated with the launch will give the total launch contribution. Different launches can be compared by calculating their effectiveness and ROI.

==== Competition ====
The impact of competition on the brand sales is captured by creating the competition variables accordingly. The variables are created from the marketing activities of the competition like television advertising, trade promotions, product launches etc. The results from the model can be used to identify the biggest threat to own brand sales from competition. The cross-price elasticity and the cross-promotional elasticity can be used to devise appropriate response to competition tactics. A successful competitive campaign can be analysed to learn valuable lesson for the own brand.

Television & Broadcasting: The application of MMM can also be applied in the broadcast media. Broadcasters may want to know what determines whether a particular program will be sponsored. This could depend on the presenter attributes, the content, and the time the program is aired. these will therefore form the independent variables in our quest to design a program salability function. Program salability is a function of the presenter attributes, the program content and the time the program is aired.

== Comparative methods ==
=== Versus media mix modeling ===
"Marketing mix modeling" is often used interchangeably with "media mix modeling". However, while related and similar in using a statistical model, they differ in focus. Media mix modeling focuses on the impact of different media channels marketing teams use on business outcomes. Such media channels include television, digital, and print media. Generally, these are paid advertising efforts. For example, a media mix model can help understand and optimize allocation on television spend to improve sales. In contrast, marketing mix modeling is a broader approach that uses all marketing mix elements, such as media channels, product promotions, pricing, distribution, public relations, sponsorships, coupons, and in-store events.

=== Versus multi-touch attribution ===
MMMs are comparable to another method called multi-touch attribution (MTA). In contrast to MMMs, the goal of multi-touch attribution is to measure the impact of marketing activities at a granular levels instead of in aggregate. The core question that MTA answers is, "What is the expected change in propensity to convert that was the result of an impression (or any form of interaction with the customer)?". In contrast, the equivalent questions for MMMs are, "What was the return on ad spend on mobile last year?" and "What would sales be if we shift 10% of the budget allocation to addressable TV?"

Some users of MMM and MTA claim they are used for different purposes, and can have conflicting results. Moreover, the differences between the two methodologies can lead companies to have separate teams to own each measurement method. Although there are efforts to unify the two methods, this increases the complexity for planning and implementation.

=== Versus incrementality testing ===
Unlike MMM (which infers contribution from historical correlations), incrementality testing uses controlled experiments to measure causal effects of marketing spend. Modern approaches integrate incrementality experiments into MMM to improve identification.

=== Integration of experiments into MMM ===
Because MMM relies on observational time-series correlations, it is sensitive to endogeneity, omitted variables, and correlated spend. As a result, many modern frameworks increasingly incorporate incrementality experiments as a source of ground-truth causal lift.

- Predictive Incrementality by Experimentation (PIE). PIE is a hybrid framework in which randomized experiments for selected media tactics are used to train a predictive model that generalizes causal lift to non-tested campaigns. PIE has been shown to lower error and improve causal validity relative to observational MMM specifications.
- Industry and platform guidance. Major advertising platforms and industry consortiums, including the Advertising Research Foundation (ARF), recommend integrating experiment-based lift estimates into MMM as a corrective for bias from correlated spend and unobserved demand drivers.
- Experiment-calibrated MMM. Aligning MMM parameters with experimental evidence—for example, constraining channel elasticities, defining priors, or validating MMM-estimated marginal returns against lift test results. Several modern playbooks highlight experiment-calibrated MMM as a safeguard against overestimation in observational models.

Experimental calibration is motivated partly by the statistical challenges of identifying small advertising effects in noisy aggregate data. Even large-scale randomized experiments may show low statistical power for advertising lift, implying that observational models without experimental grounding may substantially overestimate impact.

Large-scale field experiments have repeatedly shown that observational estimators—including MMM variants, regression adjustments, and matching estimators—often fail to recover true causal lift. A series of Facebook randomized experiments demonstrated that widely-used observational methods produced estimates that diverged dramatically from experimental ground truth despite conditioning on hundreds of covariates.

Gordon et al. (2023) further show that observational models systematically overestimate causal lift—sometimes by large margins—when compared against known experimental results.

== Studies in MMM ==
Typical MMM studies provide the following insights

- Contribution by marketing activity
- ROI by marketing activity
- Effectiveness of marketing activity
- Optimal distribution of spends
- Learnings on how to execute each activity better e.g. optimal GRPs per week, optimal distribution between 15s and 30s, which promos to run, what SKUS to put on promotion etc.

== Adoption of MMM by the industry ==
Many Fortune 500 companies that are largely consumer packaged goods (CPG) companies, such as P&G, AT&T, Kraft, Coca-Cola, Hershey, and Pepsi, have made MMM an integral part of their marketing planning. This has also been made possible due to the availability of specialist firms that are now providing MMM services. Marketing mix modeling is also offered as a software-as-a-service product by specialised vendors. A 2026 longitudinal case study in Management Decision followed one such Norwegian provider between 2021 and 2025, examining how its capabilities developed as it built an ecosystem of client and partner firms around the service.

Marketing mix models were more popular initially in the CPG industry and quickly spread to retail and pharmaceutical industries because of the availability of syndicated data in these industries. The pioneers using this in full-scale commercial application were Marketing Management Analytics (MMA) in 1990 and Hudson River Group in 1989. Later, data companies Nielsen and IRI started bundling an MMM as part of their standard data contracts, which led to these initial companies to branch out to other verticals.

Availability of time-series data is crucial to robust modeling of marketing-mix effects. The systematic management of customer data through CRM systems in other industries like telecommunications, financial services, automotive and hospitality industries helped its spread to these industries. In addition, data availability through third-party sources like Forrester Research's Ultimate Consumer Panel (financial services), Polk Insights (automotive) and Smith Travel Research (hospitality), further enhanced the application of marketing-mix modeling to these industries.

The application of marketing-mix modeling to these industries remains in a nascent stage, with standardization widely considered needed in the following areas:

- Interpretation of promotional activities across industries for e.g. promotions in CPG do not have lagged effects as they happen in-store, but automotive and hospitality promotions are usually deployed through the internet or through dealer marketing and can have longer lags in their impact. CPG promotions are usually absolute price discounts, whereas Automotive promotions can be cash-backs or loan incentives, and Financial Services promotions are usually interest rate discounts.
- Hospitality industry marketing has a very heavy seasonal pattern and most marketing-mix models will tend to confound marketing effectiveness with seasonality, thus overestimating or underestimating marketing ROI. Time-series Cross-Sectional models like 'Pooled Regression' need to be utilized, which increase sample size and variation and thus make a robust separation of pure marketing-effects from seasonality.
- Automotive Manufacturers spend a substantial amount of their marketing budgets on dealer advertising, which may not be accurately measurable if not modeled at the right level of aggregation. If modeled at the national level or even the market or DMA level, these effects may be lost in aggregation bias. On the other hand, going all the way down to dealer-level may overestimate marketing effectiveness as it would ignore consumer switching between dealers in the same area. The correct albeit rigorous approach would be to determine what dealers to combine into 'addable' common groups based on overlapping 'trade-areas' determined by consumer zip codes and cross-shopping information. At the very least 'Common Dealer Areas' can be determined by clustering dealers based on geographical distance between dealers and share of county sales. Marketing-mix models built by 'pooling' monthly sales for these dealer clusters will be effectively used to measure the impact of dealer advertising effectively.

The proliferation of marketing-mix modeling was also accelerated due to the focus from Sarbanes-Oxley Section 404 that required internal controls for financial reporting on significant expenses and outlays. Marketing for consumer goods can be in excess of a 10th of total revenues and until the advent of marketing-mix models, relied on qualitative or 'soft' approaches to evaluate this spend. Marketing-mix modeling presented a rigorous and consistent approach to evaluate marketing-mix investments as the CPG industry had already demonstrated. A study by American Marketing Association pointed out that top management was more likely to stress the importance of marketing accountability than middle management, suggesting a top-down push towards greater accountability.

== Bayesian Marketing Mix Modeling ==
Bayesian Marketing Mix Modeling (MMM) is a particular MMM that uses a probabilistic approach to manage uncertainty and integrate historical data into current analyses. This methodology contrasts to traditional frequentist methods, providing marketers with a nuanced view of consumer behavior and the effectiveness of marketing efforts.

=== Open-source software solutions ===
The wider adoption of Bayesian approaches to MMM has been significantly propelled by open-source initiatives. Notable among these are tools like PyMC-Marketing and LightweightMMM. These platforms use techniques, such as adstock transformations and the modeling of saturation effects, which help in optimizing marketing budgets and strategies.

=== Innovations in Bayesian MMM ===
Bayesian MMM is characterized by several key innovations:

- Adstock transformation – This feature captures the prolonged and cumulative impact of advertising, enabling marketers to fine-tune campaign timing and effectiveness.
- Saturation effects – Bayesian MMM helps in identifying the point of diminishing returns on marketing investments, which is crucial for efficient budget allocation.
- Time-varying saturation – Most implementations estimate one saturation curve per channel and hold it fixed across the modeling window; Google's Meridian, for example, varies only the intercept over time to capture trend and seasonality, while the Hill parameters are indexed by channel only. Some approaches instead allow the saturation parameters themselves to vary over time, for example by season, so that a channel's point of diminishing returns can differ between periods.
- Budget allocation – By simulating various marketing scenarios, businesses can leverage Bayesian MMM to direct their spending toward the most impactful channels, using a probabilistic framework that encapsulates uncertainty in optimization.

=== Challenges and opportunities ===
Bayesian MMM, while growing in popularity, does present certain challenges, notably the need for a deep understanding of Bayesian statistics and the computational demands it places on organizations. The open-source nature of tools such as PyMC-Marketing, however, helps alleviate these barriers by fostering a supportive community and resource sharing.

Other challenges to consider include data limitations (limited amounts of data and correlated input variables), as well as selection bias (e.g. ad targeting, seasonality, and funnel effects).

== Limitations ==
While marketing mix models provide much useful information, there are two key areas in which these models have limitations that should be taken into account by all of those that use these models for decision making purposes. These limitations, discussed more fully below, include:

1. The focus on short-term sales can significantly under-value the importance of longer-term equity building activities; and
2. When used for media mix optimization, these models have a clear bias in favor of time-specific media (such as TV commercials) versus less time-specific media (such as ads appearing in monthly magazines); biases can also occur when comparing broad-based media versus regionally or demographically targeted media.

In relation to the bias against equity building activities, marketing budgets optimized using marketing-mix models may tend too much towards efficiency because marketing-mix models measure only the short-term effects of marketing. Longer term effects of marketing are reflected in its brand equity. The impact of marketing spend on [brand equity] is usually not captured by marketing-mix models. One reason is that the longer duration that marketing takes to impact brand perception extends beyond the simultaneous or, at best, weeks-ahead impact of marketing on sales that these models measure. The other reason is that temporary fluctuation in sales due to economic and social conditions do not necessarily mean that marketing has been ineffective in building brand equity. On the contrary, it is very possible that in the short term sales and market-share could deteriorate, but brand equity could actually be higher. This higher equity should in the long run help the brand recover sales and market-share.

Because marketing-mix models suggest a marketing tactic has a positive impact on sales doesn't necessarily mean it has a positive impact on long-term brand equity. Different marketing measures impact short-term and long-term brand sales differently and adjusting the marketing portfolio to maximize either the short-term or the long-term alone will be sub-optimal. For example, the short-term positive effect of promotions on consumers’ utility induces consumers to switch to the promoted brand, but the adverse impact of promotions on brand equity carries over from period to period. Therefore, the net effect of promotions on a brand’s market share and profitability can be negative due to their adverse impact on brand. Determining marketing ROI on the basis of marketing-mix models alone can lead to misleading results. This is because marketing-mix attempts to optimize marketing-mix to increase incremental contribution, but marketing-mix also drives brand-equity, which is not part of the incremental part measured by marketing-mix model- it is part of the baseline. True 'Return on Marketing Investment' is a sum of short-term and long-term ROI. The fact that most firms use marketing-mix models only to measure the short-term ROI can be inferred from an article by Booz Allen Hamilton, which suggests that there is a significant shift away from traditional media to 'below-the-line' spending, driven by the fact that promotional spending is easier to measure. But academic studies have shown that promotional activities are in fact detrimental to long-term marketing ROI (Ataman et al., 2006). Short-term marketing-mix models can be combined with brand-equity models using brand-tracking data to measure 'brand ROI', in both the short- and long-term. Finally, the modeling process itself should not be more costly than the resulting gain in profitability; i.e. it should have a positive Return On Modeling Effort (ROME).

The second limitation of marketing mix models comes into play when advertisers attempt to use these models to determine the best media allocation across different media types. The traditional use of MMM's to compare money spent on TV versus money spent on couponing was relatively valid in that both TV commercials and the appearance of coupons (for example, in a FSI run in a newspaper) were both quite time specific. However, as the use of these models has been expanded into comparisons across a wider range of media types, extreme caution should be used.

Even with traditional media such as magazine advertising, the use of MMM's to compare results across media can be problematic; while the modelers overlay models of the 'typical' viewing curves of monthly magazines, these lack in precision, and thus introduce additional variability into the equation. Thus, comparisons of the effectiveness of running a TV commercial versus the effectiveness of running a magazine ad would be biased in favor of TV, with its greater precision of measurement. As new forms of media proliferate, these limitations become even more important to consider if MMM's are to be used in attempts to quantify their effectiveness. For example, Sponsorship Marketing, Sports Affinity Marketing, Viral Marketing, Blog Marketing and Mobile Marketing all vary in terms of the time-specificity of exposure.

Further, most approaches to marketing-mix models try to include all marketing activities in aggregate at the national or regional level, but to the extent that various tactics are targeted to different demographic consumer groups, their impact may be lost. For example, Mountain Dew sponsorship of NASCAR may be targeted to NASCAR fans, which may include multiple age groups, but Mountain Dew advertising on gaming blogs may be targeted to the Gen Y population. Both of these tactics may be highly effective within the corresponding demographic groups but, when included in aggregate in a national or regional marketing-mix model, may come up as ineffective.

Aggregation bias, along with issues relating to variations in the time-specific natures of different media, pose serious problems when these models are used in ways beyond those for which they were originally designed. As media become even more fragmented, it is critical that these issues are taken into account if marketing-mix models are used to judge the relative effectiveness of different media and tactics.

Marketing-mix models use historical performance to evaluate marketing performance and so are not an effective tool to manage marketing investments for new products. This is because the relatively short history of new products make marketing-mix results unstable. Also relationship between marketing and sales may be radically different in the launch and stable periods. For example, the initial performance of Coke Zero was really poor and showed low advertising elasticity. In spite of this Coke increased its media spend, with an improved strategy and radically improved its performance resulting in advertising effectiveness that is probably several times the effectiveness during the launch period. A typical marketing-mix model would have recommended cutting media spend and instead resorting to heavy price discounting.

== See also ==
- Econometric model
- Marketing strategy
- Marketing management
- Marketing plan
- Strategic management
- Strategic planning
- Marketing effectiveness
- Return on marketing investment
- Shopper marketing
- Demand chain
