= Demand chain =

Business term

In business, a demand chain is the understanding and management of customer demand, in contrast to a supply chain. P. M. Madhani (2019) suggests that the demand chain "comprises all the demand processes necessary to understand, create, and stimulate customer demand". Cranfield School of Management academic Martin Christopher has suggested that "ideally the supply chain should become a demand chain", explaining that ideally all product logistics and processing should occur "in response to a known customer requirement".

== Concept ==
Analysing the firm's activities as a linked chain is a tried and tested way of revealing value creation opportunities. The business economist Michael Porter of Harvard Business School pioneered a value chain approach: "the value chain disaggregates the firm into its strategically relevant activities in order to understand the costs and existing potential sources of differentiation". It is the micro mechanism at the level of the firm that equalizes supply and demand at the macro market level.

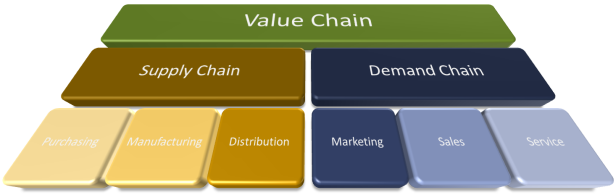
A hierarchy of supply chains

Early applications in distribution, manufacturing and purchasing collectively gave rise to a subject known as supply chain management. Old supply chains have been transformed into faster, cheaper and more reliable modern supply chains as a result of investment in information technology, cost-analysis and process-analysis.

Marketing, sales and service are the other half of the value-chain, which collectively drive and sustain demand, and are known as the Demand Chain. Progress in transforming the demand side of business is behind the supply side, but there is growing interest today in transforming demand chains.

Without marketing / supply chain management (SCM) cross-functional collaboration, firms cannot be expected to respond optimally and promptly to customers' requirements.

== Challenges ==
At present, there appear to be four main challenges to progress in transforming demand chains and making them faster, leaner and better:

- Linking Supply Chains to Demand
- Demand Chain Information Systems
- Demand Chain Process Re-Engineering
- Demand Chain Resource Distribution and Optimisation

== Linking supply chains to demand – "demand driven" v "forecast push" ==
The challenge of improving the link between demand and supply has occupied many supply chain specialists in recent years; and concepts such as "demand-driven supply chains" (Demand Driven MRP), and customer-driven supply chains have attracted attention and have become the subject of conferences and seminars.

The fundamental attribute of a "demand driven" supply chain is that material movement (or replenishment execution) are directly triggered by demand itself. Those parts of a supply chain that directly respond to orders, such as "make to order" or "assemble to order" are, therefore, "demand driven".

"Make to stock" supply chains can also be "demand driven" if individual echelon replenishment quantities are determined by the need to simply replace stock that has been consumed by the immediate downstream activity (i.e.. sold to a customer, used by a manufacturing process or moved to another distribution location). This is in contrast to "forecast push" supply chains in which the customer facing echelon replenishment quantity is calculated using a forecast of future requirements and a minimum stock balance (i.e. safety stock) while all upstream activities are coupled directly to the forecast using MRP calculations.

Due to inevitable forecast inaccuracy, "forecast push" supply chains suffer excessive and unbalanced stock levels and, despite a great deal of expediting (and associated costs) are prone to service issues. Such supply chains also experience the bullwhip effect. This occurs due to forecast error being amplified as it cascades up the supply chain and it has the unintended consequence of driving up supply chain costs and service issues, due to supply capacity being unable to meet the spiky demand pattern and the entire chain becoming unstable as a consequence. By contrast, "demand driven" supply chains are protected from the need to be buffered from variability and bullwhip by the impact of "process decoupling' and are thus able to meet planned service levels with significantly lower inventory levels and capacity costs.

"Demand driven" supply chains do use forecasts for the purposes of planning – but not replenishment execution. Forecasts are used for capacity and financial planning which are the main components of "Sales and Operations Planning". The accuracy and strategic value of S&OP is enhanced when supply chains are "demand driven" because they are less prone to unplanned capacity utilisation, "fire fighting" and focusing on resolving current performance issues (i.e. inventory and service). "Demand driven" supply chains also use forecasts for Event Management (e.g., stock build for anticipated events) when postponement strategies are not an option.

Despite academics having, for many years, written a great deal about the benefits of driving supply chains with demand (e.g.. Forrester 1958, 1961 - "Industrial Dynamics"; Burbidge 1983 - "5 Golden Rules for Avoiding Bankruptcy"; Christopher & Towill 1995), only since 2002 have 'demand driven' concepts begun to be adopted by supply chain management software providers and industry. (e.g..Lean Planning, Demand Flow Technology, Demand Driven MRP

== Information systems ==
Information about activities and costs is an essential resource for improving value chain performance. Such information is nowadays readily available for the supply chain, due to the widespread implementation of ERP technology (systems such as SAP), and these systems have been instrumental in the transformation of supply chain performance.

Demand chain IT development has focused on database marketing and CRM systems. Demand driving activities and associated costs are still recorded inconsistently, mostly on spreadsheets and even then the quality of the information tends to be incomplete and inaccurate.

Recently, however, marketing resource management systems have become available to plan, track and measure activities and costs as an embedded part of marketing workflows.

"MRM is a set of processes and capabilities that aim to enhance your ability to orchestrate and optimize the use of internal and external marketing resources...The desire to deal with increased marketing complexity, along with a mandate to do more with less, are the primary drivers behind the growth of MRM"

Implementation of MRM systems often reveals process issues that must be tackled, as Gartner have observed

"All too often, large enterprises lack documented or standardized marketing processes – resulting in misalignments, inconsistencies and wasted effort. Marketing personnel frequently rotate job responsibilities. Along with thwarting progress toward best practices and processes, this disarray contributes to a loss of corporate memory and key lessons learned. The elongated learning curve affects new or transferred employees as they struggle to find information or have to relearn what the organization, in effect, already "knows".

== Process improvement ==
Processes in a demand chain are often less well-organised and disciplined than their supply side equivalents, partly due to the absence of an agreed framework for analysing the demand chain process. In 2009, Philip Kotler and Robert Shaw proposed such a framework. Describing it as the "Idea to Demand Chain" they say:

"The I2D process can be pictured as shown in Exhibit 1; it is the mirror image of the supply chain, and contains all the activities that result in demand being stimulated. Yet unlike the supply chain, which has successfully delivered economies of scale through process simplification and process control, marketing's demand chain is primitive and inefficient. In many firms it is fragmented, obscured by departmental boundaries, invisible and unmanaged."

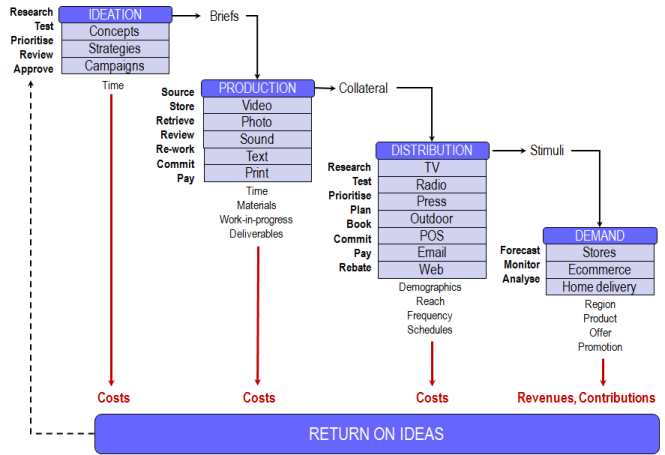

== Budget segmentation, targeting and optimization ==
Demand chain budgets for marketing, sales and service expenditure are substantial. Maximising their impact on shareholder value has become an important financial goal for decision makers. Developing a shared language across marketing and finance is one of the challenges to achieving this goal.

Segmentation is the initial thing to decide. From a strategic finance perspective "segments are responsibility centers for which a separate measure of revenues and costs is obtained". From a marketing perspective "segmentation is the act of dividing the market into distinct groups of buyers who might require separate products and/or marketing mixes". An important challenge for decision makers is how to align these two marketing and finance perspectives on segmentation.

Targeting of the budget is the final thing to decide. From the marketing perspective the challenge is how "to optimally allocate a given marketing budget to various target markets". From a finance perspective the problem is one of resource and budget allocation "determining the right quantity of resources to implement the value maximising strategy".

Optimization provides the technical basis for targeting decisions. Whilst mathematical optimization theory has been in existence since the 1950s, its application to marketing only began in the 1970s, and lack of data and computer power were limiting factors until the 1990s.

Since 2000, applying maths to budget segmentation, targeting and optimization has become more commonplace. In the UK the IPA Awards have documented over 1000 cases of modelling over 15 years, as part of their award process. The judging criteria are rigorous and not a matter of taste or fashion. Entrants must prove beyond all reasonable doubt that the marketing is profitable. It enables marketing to be brought centre stage in four important ways:

First, it translates the language of marketing and sales into the language of the boardroom. Finance and profits are the preferred language of the modern executive suite. Marketing and sales strategies have to be justified in terms of their ability to increase the financial value of the business. It provides a bridge between marketing and the other functions.

Second, it strengthens demand chain accountability. In Marketing Departments awareness, preference and satisfaction are often tracked as alternative objectives to shareholder value. In Sales Departments, sales promotion spending is often used to boost volumes, even when the result is unprofitable. Optimization modelling can assess these practices and support more rigorous accountability methods.

Third, it provides a counter-argument to the arbitrary cutting of demand chain budgets. Return on marketing investment models can help demonstrate where financial impact of demand driving activities is positive and negative, and so help support fact-based budgeting.

Finally, demand-chain profitability modelling encourages a strategic debate. Because long-term cashflow and NPV calculations can show the shareholder value effect of marketing, sales and service, strong arguments can be made for putting the demand chain on an equal footing to the supply chain.

== See also ==
- Business process management
- Customer experience management
- Demand chain management
- Demand forecasting
- Marketing effectiveness
- Marketing mix modeling
- Sales process engineering
