= Demand-chain management =

Management of supplier-customer relationship

Demand chain management is aimed at managing complex and dynamic supply and demand networks. (cf. Wieland/Wallenburg, 2011)

Demand-chain management (DCM) is the management of relationships between suppliers and customers to deliver the best value to the customer at the least cost to the demand chain as a whole. Demand-chain management is similar to supply-chain management but with special regard to the customers.

Demand-chain-management software tools bridge the gap between the customer-relationship management and the supply-chain management. The organization's supply chain processes are managed to deliver best value according to the demand of the customers. DCM creates strategic assets for the firm in terms of the overall value creation as it enables the firm to implement and integrate marketing and supply chain management (SCM) strategies that improve its overall performance. A study of the university in Wageningen (the Netherlands) sees DCM as an extension of supply chain management, due to its incorporation of the market-orientation perspective on its concept.

== Demand-driven supply network ==
A Demand-driven supply network (DDSN) is one method of supply-chain management which involves building supply chains in response to demand signals. The main force of DDSN is that it is driven by customers demand. In comparison with the traditional supply chain, DDSN uses the pull technique. It gives DDSN market opportunities to share more information and to collaborate with others in the supply chain.

DDSN uses a capability model that consist of four levels. The first level is Reacting, the second level is Anticipating, the third level is Collaborating and the last level is Orchestrating. The first two levels focus on the internal supply chain while the last two levels concentrate on external relations throughout the Extended Enterprise.

In a demand-driven chain, a customer activates the flow by ordering from the retailer, who reorders from the wholesaler, who reorders from the manufacturer, who reorders raw materials from suppliers. Orders flow backward, up the chain, in this structure.

Many companies are trying to shift from a build-to-forecast to a build-to-order discipline. The property of being demand-driven is one of degree: Being "0 percent" demand-driven means all production/inventory decisions are based on forecasts, and so, all products available for sale to the end user is there by virtue of a forecast. This could be the case of fashion goods, where the designer may not know how buyers will react to a new design, or the beverage industry, where products are produced based on a given forecast. A "100 percent" demand-driven is one in which the order is received before production begins. The commercial aircraft industry match to this description. In most cases, no production occurs until the order is received.

=== Competitive advantages ===
To create sustainable competitive advantages with DDSN, companies have to do deal with three conditions: Alignment (create shared incentives), Agility (respond quickly to short-term change) and Adaptability (adjust design of the supply chain).

=== Misconceptions ===
There are five commonly-made misconceptions of demand driven (DDSN):

1. Companies might think they are demand driven because they have a good forecast of their company.
2. They have implemented lean manufacturing.
3. They have great data on all their customers.
4. They think it is a technology project and the corporate forecast is a demand visibility signal.
5. They have a better view of customers demand.

An important component of DDSN is DDM ("real-time" demand driven manufacturing). DDM gives customers the opportunity to say what they want, where and when.

== Demand-driven execution ==
Demand-chain management is the same as supply chain management, but with emphasis on consumer pull vs. supplier push. The demand chain begins with customers, then funnels through any resellers, distributors, and other business partners who help sell the company's products and services. The demand chain includes both direct and indirect sales forces. Customers demand is hard to detect because out of stock situations (OOS) falsify data collected from POS-Terminals. According to studies of Corsten/Gruen (2002, 2008) the OOS-rate is about 8%. For products under sales promotion OOS rates up to 30% exist. Reliable information about demand is necessary for DCM therefore lowering OOS is a main factor for successful DCM.

Corsten and Gruen describe key factors for lowering OOS-rates:

- Data accuracy
- Forecast and order accuracy
- Order quantity
- Replenishment
- Capacity (time supply)
- Capacity (Packout) and Planogram Compliance
- Shelf Replenishment

Implementation of system supported processes leads to the new technology Extreme Transaction Processing described by Gartner Research. This technology allows to process the huge amount of data (POS, RFID) in real time providing information for store managers, shelve managers and the supply chain.

According to studies of Ayers, in order to find appropriate methods which fitting different kinds of companies, the first thing companies should do is to assess their progress toward achieving world-class levels of supply chain management. In order to raise demand-driven levels, companies need to undertake a systematic effort that has three elements:

1. Shortening process lead-time: Overall lead-time is composed of individual cycle-times for multiple processes. This step involves shortening the cycle-time at each step in the critical path processes from the point of purchase to the start of production for the entire supply chain.
2. Adopting flow model economics: Flow model economics encompass low-cost ways to vary mix and volume. Lean manufacturing is a discipline that has the same goals as flow economics.
3. Replacing forecasts with demand: This step requires efficient sharing of information up and down the chain. An ideal is for all partners to have access to the level of real-time sales as well as the business rules to react.

== Demand-driven supply-chain assessment ==
Companies must have an appropriate performance-measurement system to be applied on a regular basis to identify areas to be improved in order to establish a sustainable continuous improvement process. According to Dale and Ritchie, to use self-assessment process is very important. The self-assessment will allow organizations to discern its strengths and gaps, and define improvement actions linked to the business planning process. There are some necessary criteria for a successful self-assessment process:

- Gaining commitment and support from all levels of staff
- Action being taken from the previous self-assessment
- Incorporation of self-assessment into the business planning process
- Not allowing the process to be "added on" to employees existing workload
- Developing a framework for performance monitoring

The importance of supply chain and operations audit process which represents a fundamental step to support improvement projects. According to study by Salama et al., the core element of audits is the diagnostic stage and that no audit can be considered successful unless it really provides a thorough understanding of how the constituent elements of an organization interact with one another (e.g., people, processes and technologies), that is the interactions which constrain the system, and how these interactions are reflected on the market-driven performance. The provided a set of features and requirements for an audit methodology that can be considered when developing a DDSC assessment:

- Quick/Accurate – The methodology should be based on tools, steps and an"engine" which were designed to deliver a result as accurate as possible in the shortest time possible.
- Not invasive – The methodology should be built in order to require the least possible effort from organization's resource.
- Scalable – The methodology should be scalable.
- Avoid bias/theoretically grounded – The methodology should be built in a way to reduce possible bias in the diagnostic stage, while exploiting the knowledge that people who daily work in an organization have on their processes.
- Stimulate consensus building – The stimulation of consensus building can be achieved in different ways.
- Transparent – All tools and steps used in the methodology should be clearly described in all parts. No "secret engine" is behind the methodology.

== See also ==
- Demand chain
- Supply chain
- Supply network
