= Industrial Revolution =

1760–1840 agrarian to industrial era shift

- c. 1760 – c. 1840
Proto-industrialisation	Second Industrial Revolution
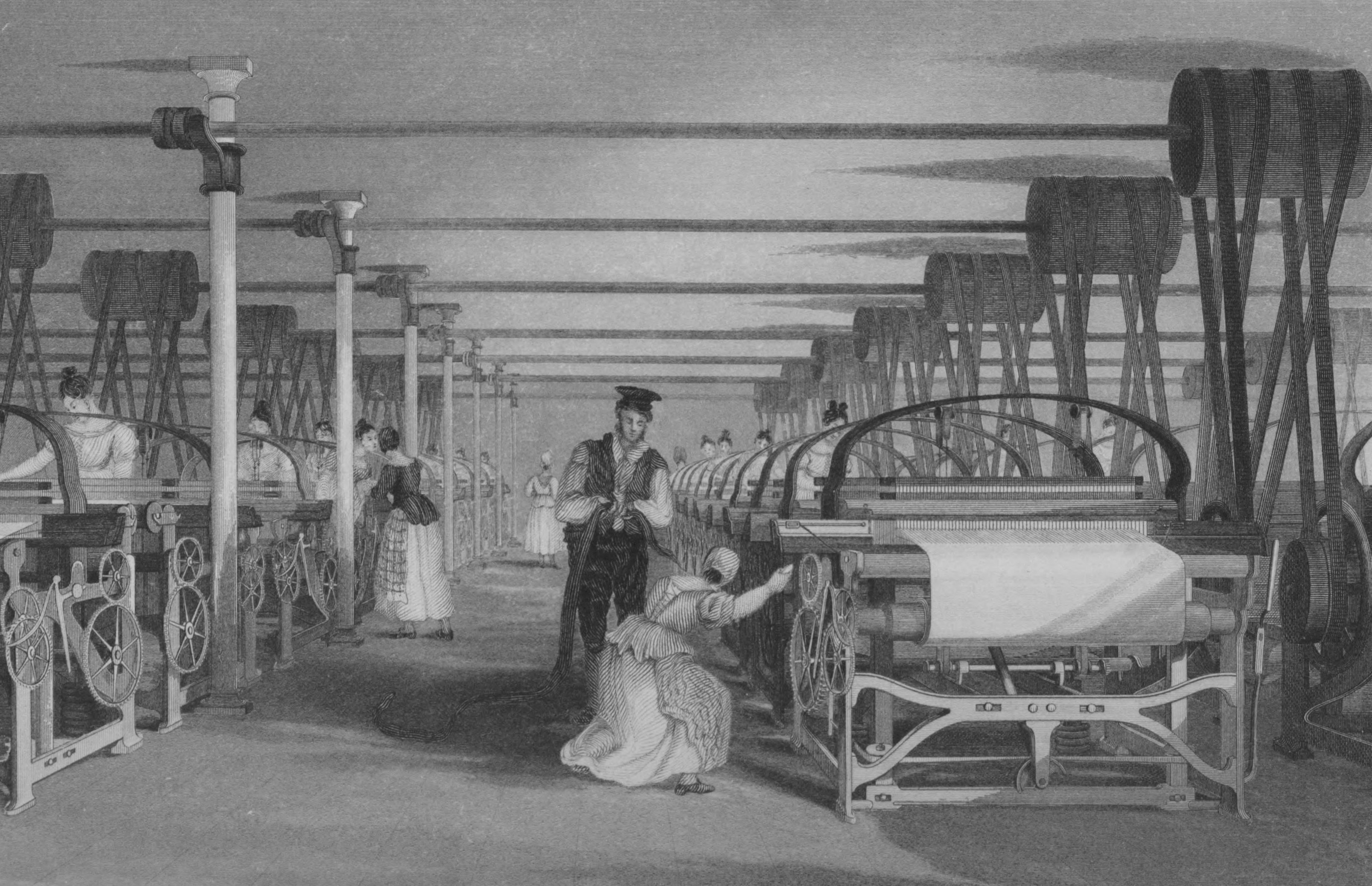
- A Roberts loom in a weaving shed in the United Kingdom in 1835
- Location: Great Britain; Western Europe; North America
- Key events: Mechanised textile production; Canal construction; Steam engine; Factory system; Iron production increase

The Industrial Revolution, sometimes called the First Industrial Revolution in contrast to the subsequent Second Industrial Revolution, was a transitional period of the global economy toward more widespread, efficient and stable manufacturing processes, succeeding the Second Agricultural Revolution. Beginning in Great Britain around 1760, the Industrial Revolution had spread to continental Europe and the United States by about 1840. Economic historians agree that the onset of the Industrial Revolution is the most important event in human history, comparable only to the adoption of agriculture for material advancement.

This transition included going from hand production methods to machines; new chemical manufacturing and iron production processes; the increasing use of water power and steam power; the development of machine tools; and rise of the mechanised factory system. Output greatly increased, and the result was an unprecedented rise in population and population growth. Many technological and architectural innovations were British. By the mid-18th century, Britain was the leading commercial nation, with GDP per capita considerably over the world average. The textile industry was the first to use modern production methods, and textiles became the dominant industry in terms of employment, value of output, and capital invested.

The precise start and end of the Industrial Revolution is debated among historians, as is the pace of economic and social changes. Rapid adoption of mechanized textiles spinning occurred in Britain in the 1780s, and high rates of growth in steam power and iron production occurred after 1800. Mechanised textile production spread from Britain to continental Europe and the US in the early 19th century.

A recession occurred from the late 1830s when the adoption of the Industrial Revolution's early innovations, such as mechanised spinning and weaving, slowed as markets matured despite increased adoption of locomotives, steamships, and hot blast iron smelting. New technologies such as the electrical telegraph, widely introduced in the 1840s in the UK and US, were not sufficient to drive high rates of growth. Rapid growth reoccurred after 1870, springing from new innovations in the Second Industrial Revolution. These included steel-making processes, mass production, assembly lines, electrical grid systems, large-scale manufacture of machine tools, and use of advanced machinery in steam-powered factories.

The Industrial Revolution influenced almost every aspect of life. In particular, average income and population began to exhibit unprecedented sustained growth, with the standard of living improving for most in the Western world, though others have said it did not begin to improve meaningfully until the 20th century. Prior to the Industrial Revolution, most manufacturing occurred in China and India; after the Industrial Revolution, most manufacturing took place in North America and Western Europe.

== Etymology ==
The earliest recorded use of "Industrial Revolution" was in 1799 by French envoy Louis-Guillaume Otto, announcing that France had entered the race to industrialise. Raymond Williams states: "The idea of a new social order based on major industrial change was clear in Southey and Owen, between 1811–18, and was implicit as early as Blake in the early 1790s and Wordsworth at the turn of the [19th] century." The term Industrial Revolution applied to technological change became more common by the 1830s, as in Jérôme-Adolphe Blanqui's description in 1837 of la révolution industrielle. Friedrich Engels in The Condition of the Working Class in England in 1844 spoke of "an industrial revolution, a revolution which...changed the whole of civil society". His book was not translated into English until the late 19th century, and the expression did not enter everyday language till then. Credit for its popularisation is given to Arnold Toynbee, whose 1881 lectures gave a detailed account of the term.

Economic historians such as Mendels, Pomeranz, and Kridte argue proto-industrialisation in parts of Europe, the Islamic world, Mughal India, and China created the social and economic conditions that led to the Industrial Revolution, thus causing the Great Divergence. Some historians, such as John Clapham and Nicholas Crafts, have argued that the economic and social changes occurred gradually and that revolution is a misnomer.

== Enabling factors ==
Several factors enabled industrialisation: high agricultural productivity, such as reflected in the British Agricultural Revolution, to provide excess manpower and food; managerial and entrepreneurial skills; available ports, rivers, canals, and roads to cheaply move raw materials and outputs; natural resources such as coal, iron, and waterfalls; political stability and a legal system that supported business; and financial capital available to invest. Once industrialisation began in Britain, other enabling factors included: the eagerness of British entrepreneurs to export industrial expertise and willingness of others to import the process. Britain had acquired the required factors and industrialized starting in the 18th century, and the process was then exported to western Europe and US in the early 19th century, and then Japan in the late 19th century.

=== Important technological developments ===
The commencement of the Industrial Revolution is closely linked to a small number of innovations, beginning in the second half of the 18th century. By the 1830s, the following gains had been made in important technologies:

- Textiles – mechanised cotton spinning powered by water, and later steam, increased output per worker by a factor of around 500. The power loom increased output by a factor of 40. The cotton gin increased productivity of removing seed from cotton by a factor of 50. Large gains in productivity occurred in spinning and weaving of wool and linen, but were not as great as in cotton.
- Steam power – the efficiency of steam engines increased so they used between one-fifth and one-tenth as much fuel. The adaptation of stationary steam engines to rotary motion made them suitable for industrial uses. The high-pressure engine had a high power-to-weight ratio, making it suitable for transportation. Steam power underwent a rapid expansion after 1800.
- Iron-making – the substitution of coke for charcoal greatly lowered the fuel cost of pig iron and wrought iron production. Using coke also allowed larger blast furnaces, resulting in economies of scale. The steam engine began being used to power blast air in the 1750s, enabling a large increase in iron production by overcoming the limitation of water power. The cast iron blowing cylinder was first used in 1760. It was improved by making it double acting, which allowed higher blast furnace temperatures. The puddling process produced structural grade iron at lower cost than the finery forge. The rolling mill was fifteen times faster than hammering wrought iron. Developed in 1828, hot blast greatly increased fuel efficiency in iron production.
- Invention of machine tools – the first machine tools were the screw-cutting lathe, the cylinder boring machine, and the milling machine. Machine tools made the economical manufacture of precision metal parts possible, although it took decades to develop effective techniques for making Interchangeable parts.

=== Textile manufacture ===
==== British textile industry ====
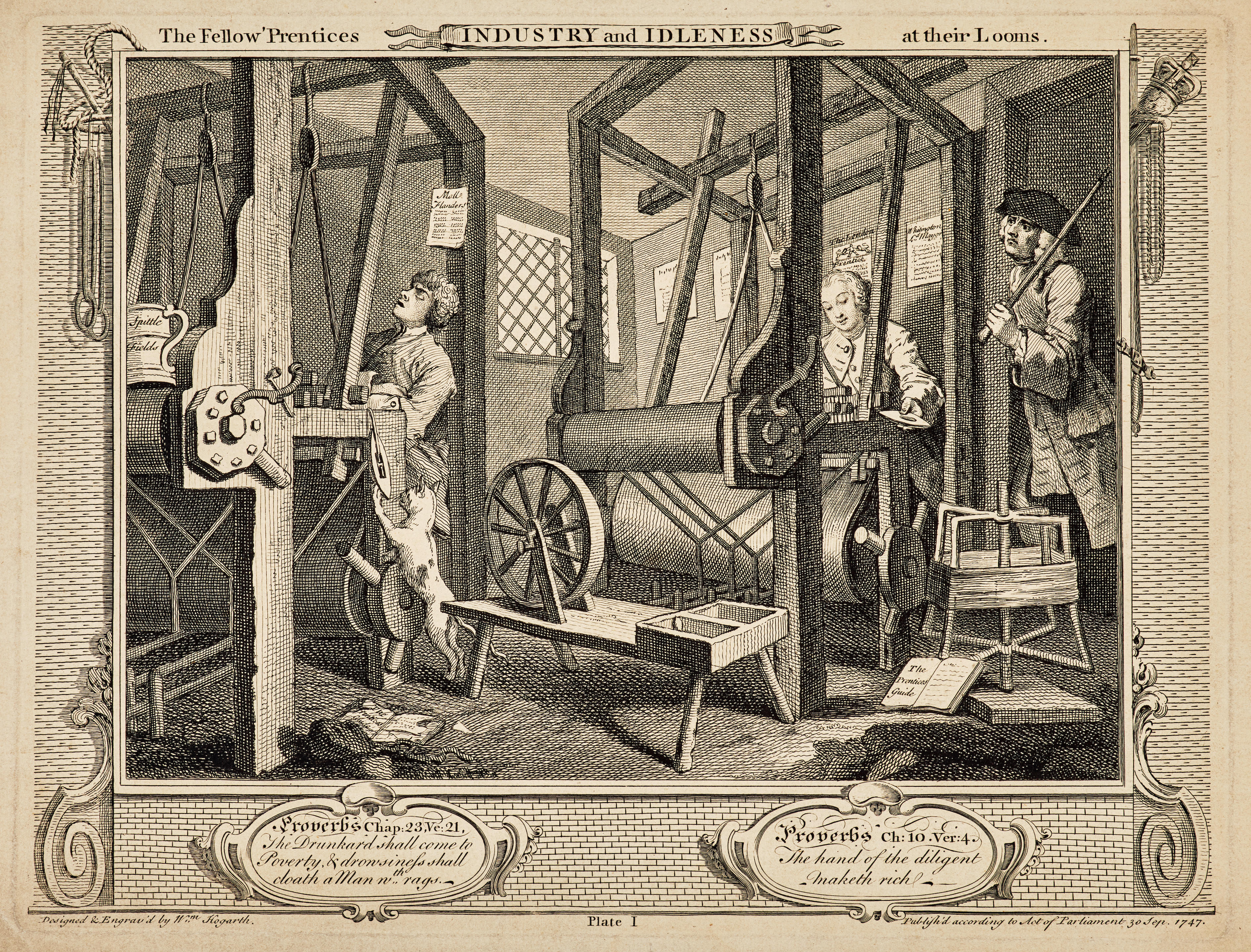
Weaving with handlooms from William Hogarth's Industry and Idleness in 1747

In 1750, Britain imported 2.5 million pounds of raw cotton, most of which was spun and woven by the cottage industry in Lancashire. The work was done by hand in workers' homes or master weavers' shops. Wages were six times those in India in 1770 when productivity in Britain was three times higher. In 1787, raw cotton consumption was 22 million pounds, most of which was cleaned, carded, and spun on machines. The British textile industry used 52 million pounds of cotton in 1800, and 588 million pounds in 1850.

The share of value added by the cotton industry in Britain was 2.6% in 1760, 17% in 1801, and 22% in 1831. Value added by the woollen industry was 14% in 1801. Cotton factories numbered about 900 in 1797. In 1760, approximately one-third of cotton cloth manufactured was exported, rising to two-thirds by 1800. In 1781, cotton spun amounted to 5 million pounds, which increased to 56 million pounds by 1800. In 1800, less than 0.1% of world cotton cloth was produced on machinery invented in Britain. In 1788, there were 50,000 spindles in Britain, rising to 7 million over the next 30 years.

==== Wool ====
The earliest European attempts at mechanised spinning were with wool; however, wool spinning proved more difficult to mechanise than cotton. Productivity improvement in wool spinning during the Industrial Revolution was significant, but less than cotton.

==== Silk ====
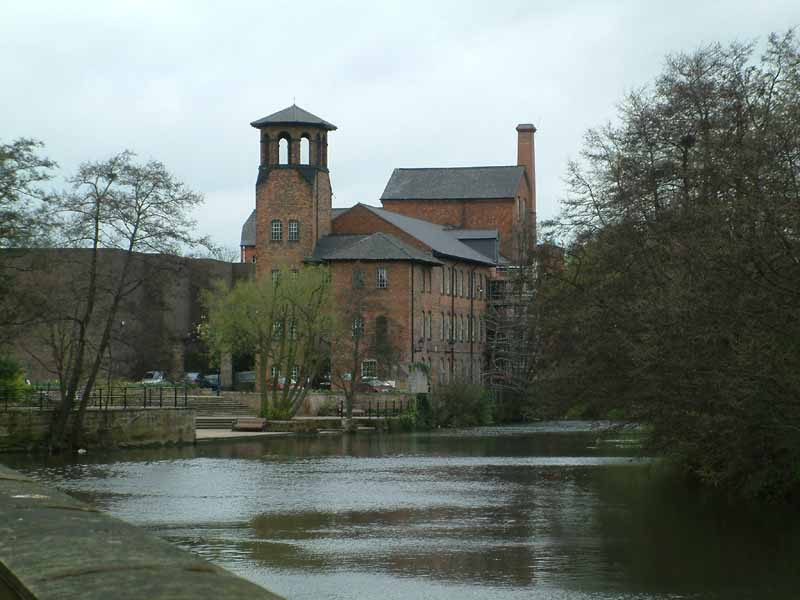
John Lombe's silk mill site today in Derby, rebuilt as Derby Silk Mill

Arguably the first highly mechanised factory was John Lombe's water-powered silk mill at Derby, operational by 1721. Lombe learned silk thread manufacturing by taking a job in Italy and acting as an industrial spy; however, because the Italian silk industry guarded its secrets, the state of the industry at that time is unknown. Although Lombe's factory was technically successful, the supply of raw silk from Italy was cut off to eliminate competition. To promote manufacturing, the Crown paid for models of Lombe's machinery which were exhibited in the Tower of London.

==== Cotton ====
Parts of India, China, Central America, South America, and the Middle East have a history of hand-manufacturing cotton textiles, which became a major industry after 1000 AD. Most cotton was grown by small farmers alongside food and spun in households for domestic consumption. In the 1400s, China began to require households to pay part of their taxes in cotton cloth. By the 17th century, almost all Chinese wore cotton clothing, and it could be used as a medium of exchange. In India, cotton textiles were manufactured for distant markets, often produced by professional weavers.

Cotton was a difficult raw material for Europe to obtain before it was grown on colonial plantations. Spanish explorers found Native Americans growing sea island (Gossypium barbadense) and upland cotton (Gossypium hirsutum). Sea island cotton was exported from Barbados from the 1650s. Upland cotton was uneconomical because of the difficulty of removing seed, a problem solved by the cotton gin. A strain of cotton seed brought from Mexico to Natchez, Mississippi, in 1806 became the parent genetic material for 90% of world production today; it produced bolls three to four times faster to pick.

==== Trade and textiles ====
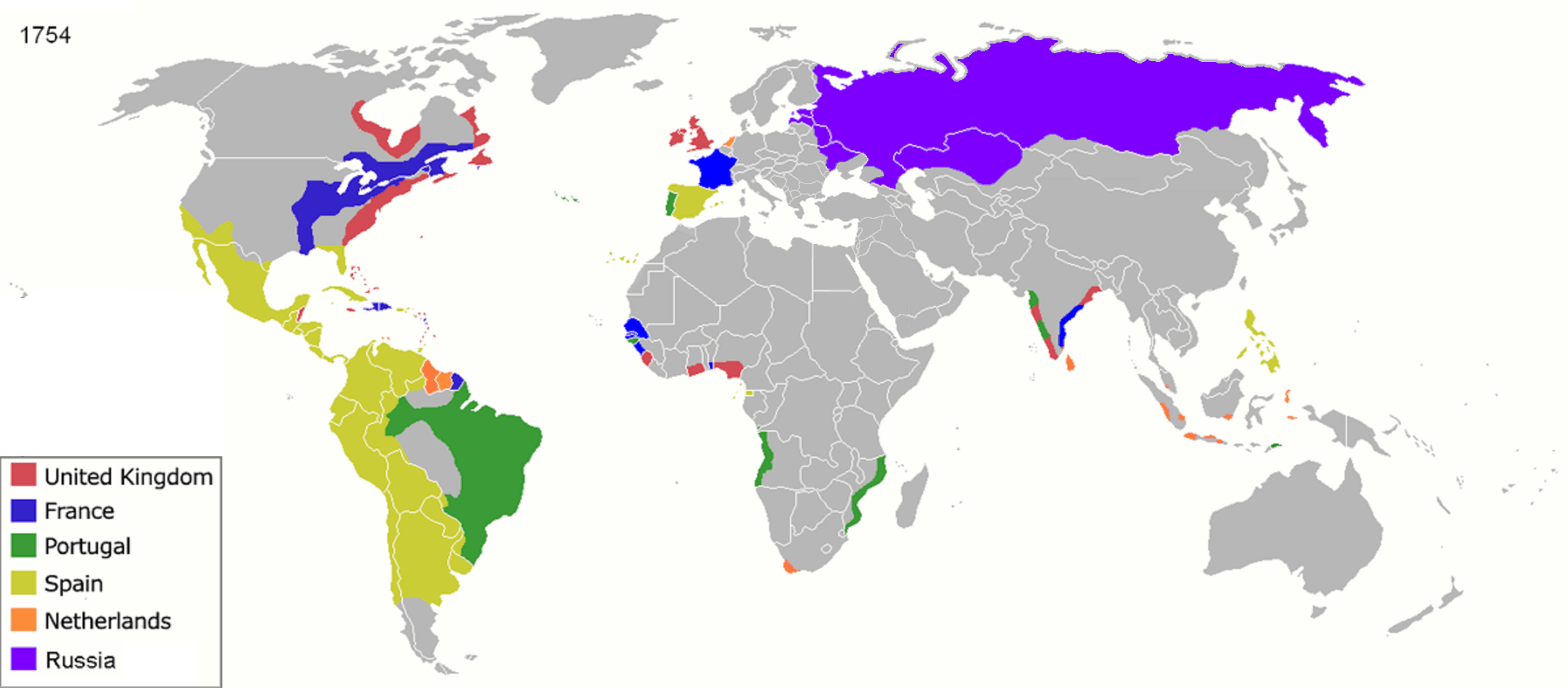
European colonial empires at the start of the Industrial Revolution, superimposed upon modern political boundaries

The Age of Discovery was followed by colonialism beginning around the 16th century. Following the discovery of a trade route to India around southern Africa by the Portuguese, the British founded the East India Company, and other countries founded companies, which established trading posts throughout the Indian Ocean region.

A large segment of this trade was in cotton textiles, which were purchased in India and sold in Southeast Asia, including the Indonesian archipelago where spices were purchased for sale to Southeast Asia and Europe. By the 1760s, cloth was over three-quarters of the East India Company's exports. Indian textiles were in demand in Europe, where previously only wool and linen were available; however, cotton goods consumed in Europe was minor until the early 19th century.

==== Pre-mechanized European textile production ====
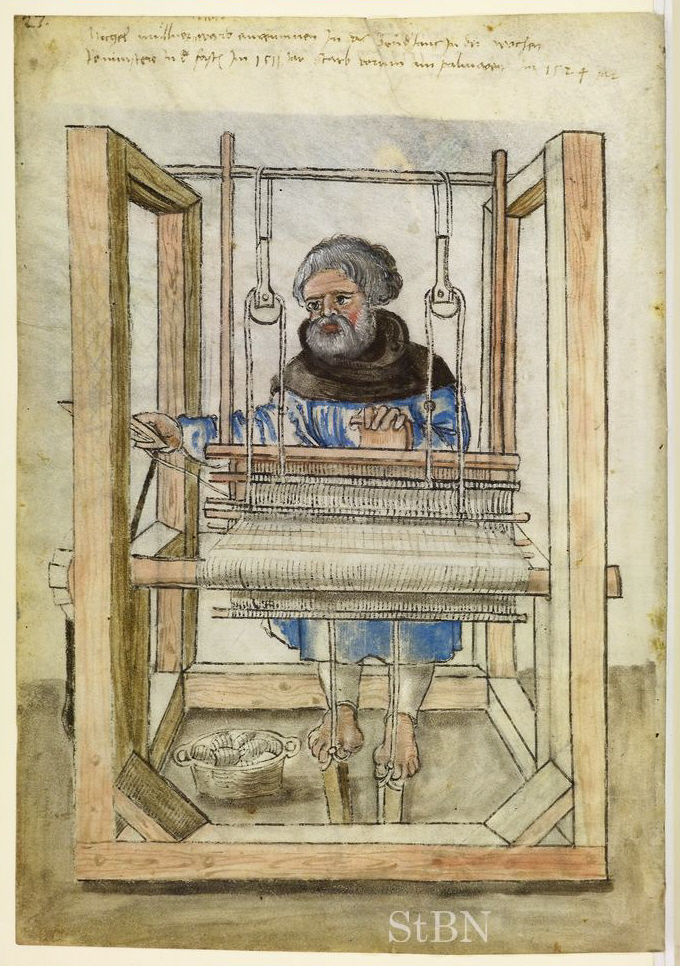
Weaver in Nuremberg, c. 1524

By 1600, Flemish refugees began weaving cotton in English towns where cottage spinning and weaving of wool and linen was established. They were left alone by the guilds who did not consider cotton a threat. Earlier European attempts at cotton spinning and weaving were in 12th-century Italy and 15th-century southern Germany, but these ended when the supply of cotton was cut off.

British cloth could not compete with Indian cloth because India's labour cost was approximately one-fifth that of Britain's. In 1700 and 1721, the British government passed Calico Acts to protect domestic woollen and linen industries from cotton fabric imported from India. The demand for heavier fabric was met by a domestic industry based around Lancashire that produced fustian, a cloth with flax warp and cotton weft. Flax was used for the warp because wheel-spun cotton had insufficient strength, the resulting blend was not as soft as 100% cotton and more difficult to sew.

On the eve of the Industrial Revolution, spinning and weaving were done in households, for domestic consumption, and as a cottage industry under the putting-out system. Under the putting-out system, home-based workers produced under contract to merchant sellers, who often supplied the raw materials. In the off-season, the women, typically farmers' wives, did the spinning and the men did the weaving. Using the spinning wheel, it took 4–8 spinners to supply one handloom weaver.

==== Invention of textile machinery ====
A model of the spinning jenny in a museum in Wuppertal. Invented by James Hargreaves in 1764, the spinning jenny was one of the innovations that started the revolution.

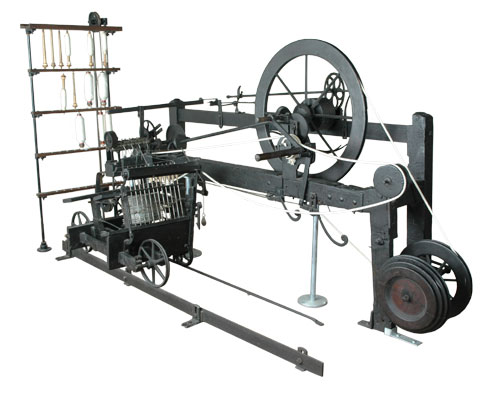
The only surviving example of a spinning mule built by the inventor Samuel Crompton, the mule produced high-quality thread with minimal labour, now on display at Bolton Museum in Greater Manchester

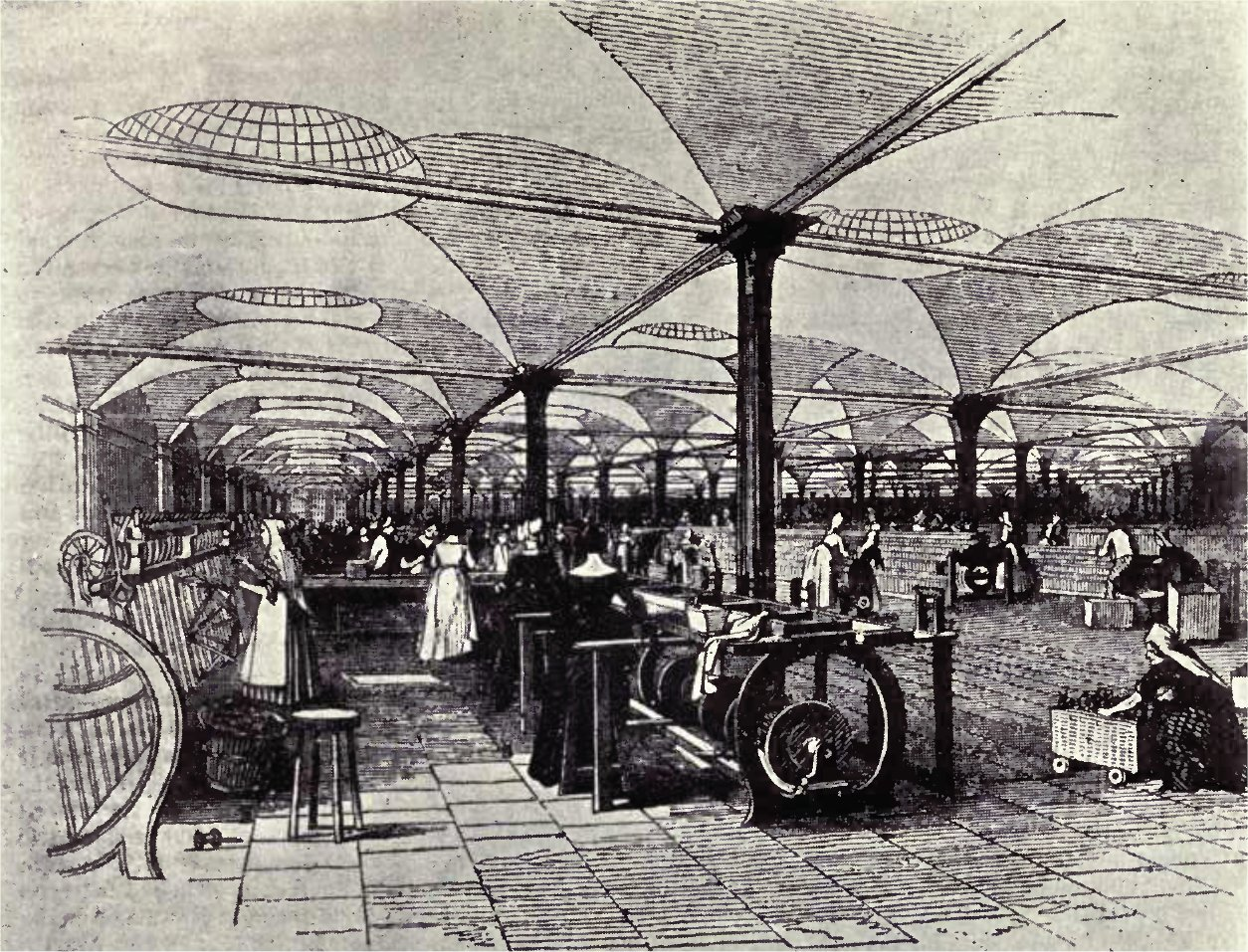
The interior of Marshall's Temple Works in Leeds, West Yorkshire

The flying shuttle, patented in 1733 by John Kay, doubled the output of a weaver, worsening the imbalance between spinning and weaving. It became widely used around Lancashire after 1760 when John's son, Robert, invented the dropbox, which facilitated changing thread colors.

Lewis Paul patented the roller spinning frame and the flyer-and-bobbin system for drawing wool to a more even thickness. The technology was developed with John Wyatt of Birmingham. In 1743, a factory opened in Northampton with 50 spindles on each of five of Paul and Wyatt's machines. A similar mill was built by Daniel Bourn. Paul and Bourn patented carding machines in 1748. Based on two sets of rollers that travelled at different speeds, it was later used in the first cotton spinning mill.

In 1764, in Oswaldtwistle, Lancashire, James Hargreaves invented the spinning jenny. It was the first practical spinning frame with multiple spindles. The jenny worked similarly to the spinning wheel, by first clamping down on the fibres, then drawing them out, followed by twisting. It was a simple, wooden-framed machine that only cost £6 for a 40-spindle model in 1792 and was used mainly by home spinners.

The water frame, was developed by Richard Arkwright, who patented it in 1769. The design was partly based on a spinning machine built by Kay, hired by Arkwright. The water frame could produce a hard, medium-count thread suitable for warp, finally allowing 100% cotton cloth to be made in Britain. Arkwright used water power at a factory in Cromford, Derbyshire in 1771, giving the invention its name. Samuel Crompton invented the spinning mule in 1779, so called because it is a hybrid of Arkwright's water frame and James Hargreaves's spinning jenny. Crompton's mule could produce finer thread than hand spinning, at lower cost. Mule-spun thread was of suitable strength to be used as a warp and allowed Britain to produce highly competitive yarn in large quantities.

Realising expiration of the Arkwright patent would greatly increase the supply of spun cotton and lead to a shortage of weavers, Edmund Cartwright developed a vertical power loom which he patented in 1785. Samuel Horrocks patented a loom in 1813, which was improved by Richard Roberts in 1822, and these were produced in large numbers by Roberts, Hill & Co. Roberts was a maker of high-quality machine tools and pioneer in the use of jigs and gauges for precision workshop measurement.

The demand for cotton presented an opportunity to planters in the US, who thought upland cotton would be profitable if a better way could be found to remove the seed. Eli Whitney responded by inventing the inexpensive cotton gin. A man using a cotton gin could remove seed in one day, which previously took two months.

These advances were capitalised on by entrepreneurs, of whom the best known is Arkwright. He is credited with a list of inventions, but these were developed by such people as Kay and Thomas Highs. Arkwright nurtured the inventors, patented the ideas, financed the initiatives, and protected the machines. He created the cotton mill which brought the production processes together in a factory, and developed the use of power, which made cotton manufacture a mechanised industry. Other inventors increased the efficiency of spinning, so the supply of yarn increased greatly. Steam power was then applied to drive textile machinery. Manchester acquired the nickname Cottonopolis during the early 19th century owing to its sprawl of textile factories.

Though mechanisation dramatically decreased the cost of cotton cloth, by the mid-19th century machine-woven cloth still could not equal the quality of hand-woven Indian cloth. However, the high productivity of British textile manufacturing allowed coarser grades of British cloth to undersell hand-spun and woven fabric in low-wage India, destroying the Indian industry.

=== Metallurgy ===
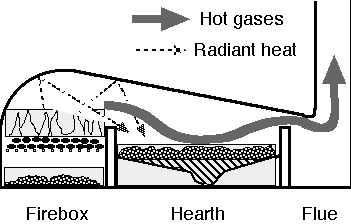
The reverberatory furnace could produce cast iron using mined coal; the burning coal is separated from the iron to prevent constituents of the coal, such as sulfur and silica, from becoming impurities in the iron. Iron production increased due to the ability to use mined coal directly.

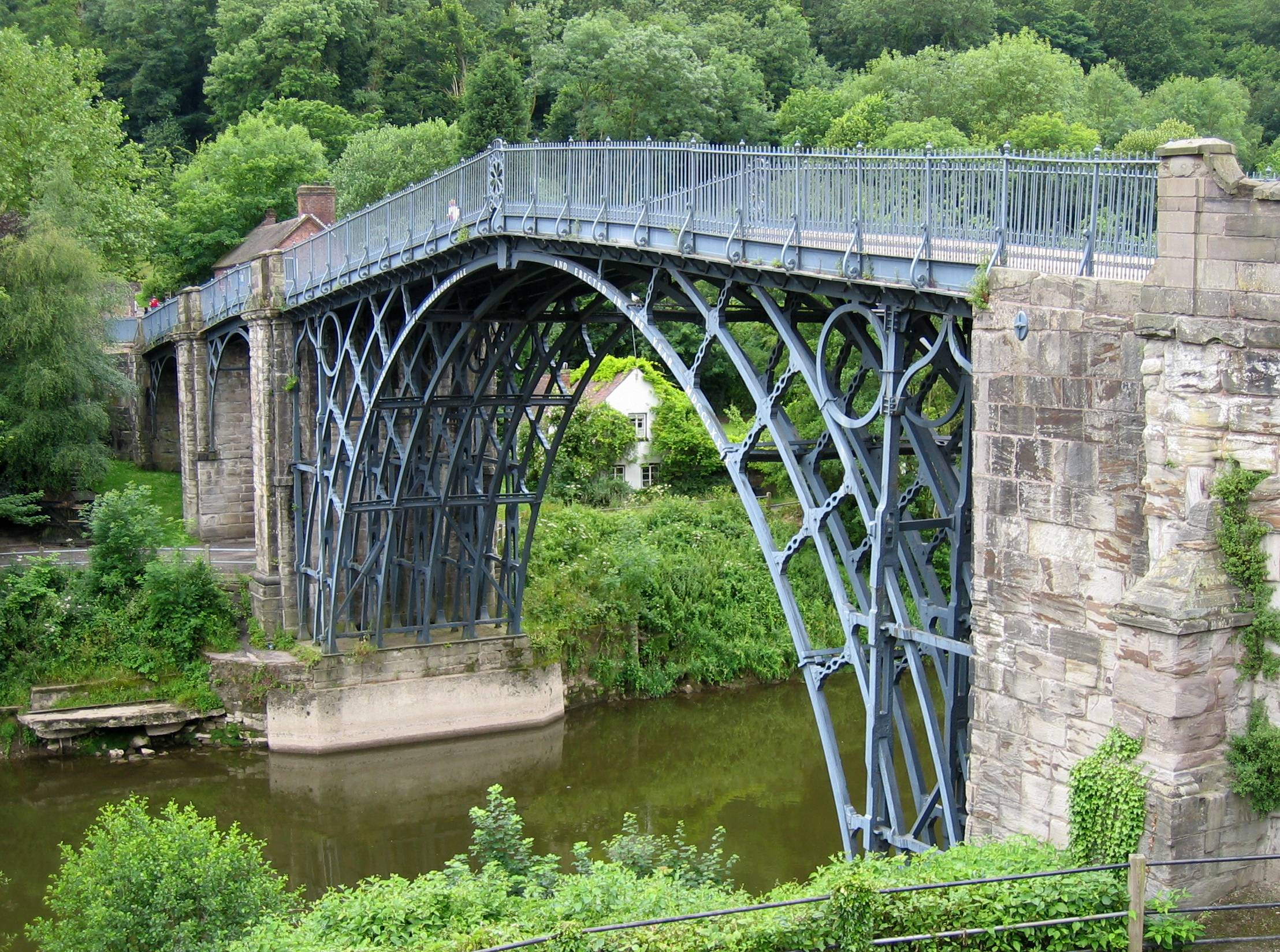
The Iron Bridge in Shropshire, England, the world's first bridge constructed of iron, opened in 1781.

==== British iron production ====
In the UK in 1720, there were 20,500 tons of charcoal iron and 400 tons with coke. In 1806, charcoal iron production had dropped to 7,800 tons and coke cast iron was 250,000 tons. In 1750, the UK imported 31,000 tons of bar iron and either refined from cast iron or directly produced 18,800 tons of bar iron, using charcoal and 100 tons using coke. In 1796, the UK was making 125,000 tons of bar iron with coke and 6,400 tons with charcoal; imports were 38,000 tons and exports were 24,600 tons. In 1806 the UK did not import bar iron but exported 31,500 tons.

==== Iron process innovations ====
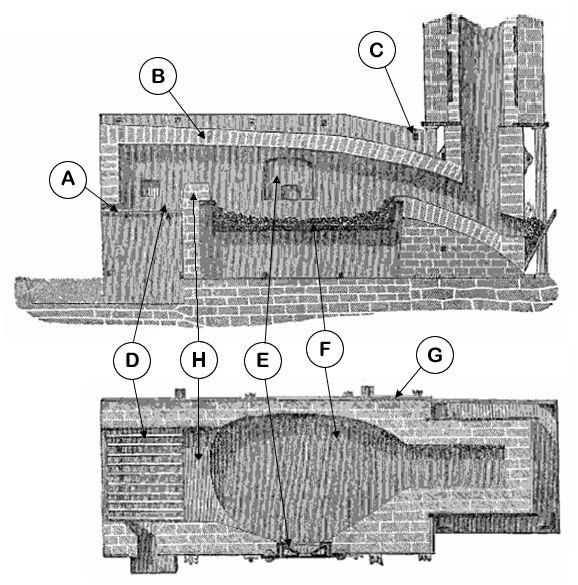
Horizontal (lower) and vertical (upper) cross-sections of a single puddling furnace

A major change in the iron industries, during the Industrial Revolution, was the replacement of wood and other bio-fuels with coal. For a given amount of heat, mining coal required much less labour than cutting wood and converting it to charcoal, and coal was more abundant than wood, supplies of which were becoming scarce before the enormous increase in iron production that took place in the late 18th century.

In 1709, Abraham Darby made progress using coke to fuel his blast furnaces at Coalbrookdale. However, the coke pig iron made was not suitable for making wrought iron and was used mostly for the production of cast iron goods. He had the advantage over his rivals in that his pots, cast by his patented process, were thinner and cheaper.

In 1750, coke had replaced charcoal in the smelting of copper and lead and was in widespread use in glass production. In the smelting and refining of iron, coal and coke produced inferior iron to that made with charcoal because of the coal's sulfur content. Low sulfur coals were known, but they still contained harmful amounts. Another factor limiting the iron industry was the scarcity of water power to power blast bellows. This limitation was overcome by the steam engine.

Use of coal in iron smelting started before the Industrial Revolution, based on innovations by Clement Clerke and others from 1678, using coal reverberatory furnaces known as cupolas. These were operated by the flames playing on the ore and charcoal or coke mixture, reducing the oxide to metal. This has the advantage that impurities in the coal do not migrate into the metal. This technology was applied to lead in 1678, copper in 1687, and iron foundries in the 1690s, but in this case the reverberatory furnace was known as an air furnace.

Coke pig iron was hardly used to produce wrought iron until 1755, when Darby's son Abraham Darby II built furnaces at Horsehay and Ketley where low sulfur coal was available, and not far from Coalbrookdale. These furnaces were equipped with water-powered bellows, the water being pumped by Newcomen atmospheric engines. Abraham Darby III installed similar steam-pumped, water-powered blowing cylinders at the Dale Company when he took control in 1768. The Dale Company used Newcomen engines to drain its mines and made parts for engines which it sold throughout the country.

Steam engines made the use of higher-pressure and volume blast practical; however, the leather used in bellows was expensive to replace. In 1757, ironmaster John Wilkinson patented a hydraulic powered blowing engine for blast furnaces. The blowing cylinder for blast furnaces was introduced in 1760 and the first blowing cylinder made of cast iron is believed to be the one used at Carrington in 1768, designed by John Smeaton.

Cast iron cylinders for use with a piston were difficult to manufacture. James Watt had difficulty trying to have a cylinder made for his first steam engine. In 1774 Wilkinson invented a machine for boring cylinders. After Wilkinson bored the first successful cylinder for a Boulton and Watt steam engine in 1776, he was given an exclusive contract for providing cylinders. Watt developed a rotary steam engine in 1782; they were widely applied to blowing, hammering, rolling and slitting.

In addition to lower cost and greater availability, coke had other advantages over charcoal in that it was harder and made the column of materials flowing down the blast furnace more porous and did not crush in the much taller furnaces of the late 19th century.

As cast iron became cheaper and widely available, it began being a structural material for bridges and buildings. A famous early example is The Iron Bridge built in 1778 with cast iron produced by Abraham Darby III. However, most cast iron was converted to wrought iron. Conversion of cast iron had long been done in a finery forge. An improved refining process known as potting and stamping was developed, but this was superseded by Henry Cort's puddling process. Cort developed significant iron manufacturing processes: rolling in 1783 and puddling in 1784. Puddling produced a structural grade iron at a relatively low cost. Puddling was backbreaking and extremely hot work. Few puddlers lived to be 40. Puddling became widely used after 1800. British iron manufacturers had used considerable amounts of iron imported from Sweden and Russia to supplement domestic supplies. Because of the increased British production, by the 1790s Britain eliminated imports and became a net exporter of bar iron.

Hot blast, patented by the Scottish inventor James Beaumont Neilson in 1828, was the most important development of the 19th century for saving energy in making pig iron. The amount of fuel to make a unit of pig iron was reduced at first by between one-third using coke or two-thirds using coal; the efficiency gains continued as the technology improved. Hot blast raised the operating temperature of furnaces, increasing their capacity. Using less coal or coke meant introducing fewer impurities into the pig iron. This meant that lower quality coal could be used in areas where coking coal was unavailable or too expensive; however, by the end of the 19th century transportation costs fell considerably.

Shortly before the Industrial Revolution, an improvement was made in the production of steel, which was an expensive commodity and used only where iron would not do, such as for cutting edge tools and springs. Benjamin Huntsman developed his crucible steel technique in the 1740s. The supply of cheaper iron and steel aided a number of industries, such as those making nails, hinges, wire, and other hardware items. The development of machine tools allowed better working of iron, causing it to be increasingly used in the rapidly growing machinery and engine industries.

==== Copper smelting ====
Smelting of copper in reverberatory furnaces using coal was pioneered in Bristol in the 1680s. Swansea in Britain developed in the 19th century into the World's prime hub of copper smelting importing ore from places like Chile, Cuba and Australia.

Reverberatory furnaces were introduced to Chile around 1830 by Charles Saint Lambert. This revolutionized Chilean copper mining to such degree that the country came to supply 19% of the copper produced worldwide in the 19th century. The use of mineral coal instead charcoal in reverberatory furnaces introduced by Saint Lambert also meant a decrease in the dependency on the scarce firewood to be found on Atacama Desert and its surrounding semi-arid areas as was the case with earlier smelting technology.

=== Steam power ===
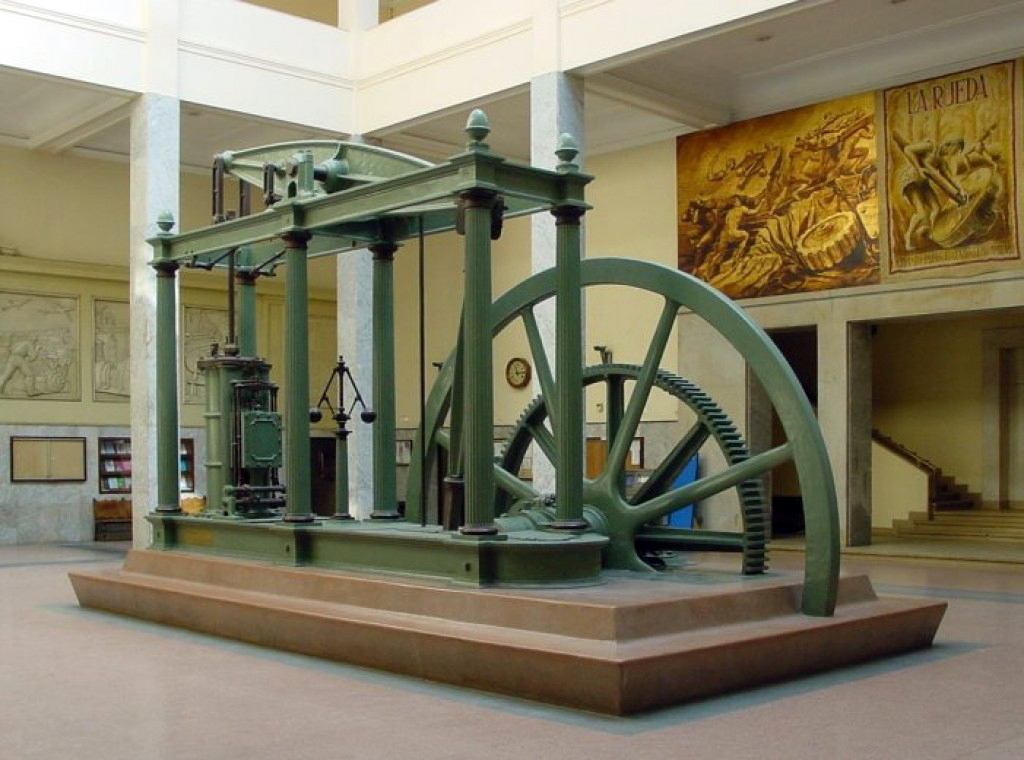
A Watt steam engine, invented by James Watt, who transformed the steam engine from a reciprocating motion that was used for pumping to a rotating motion suited to industrial applications; Watt and others significantly improved the efficiency of the steam engine.

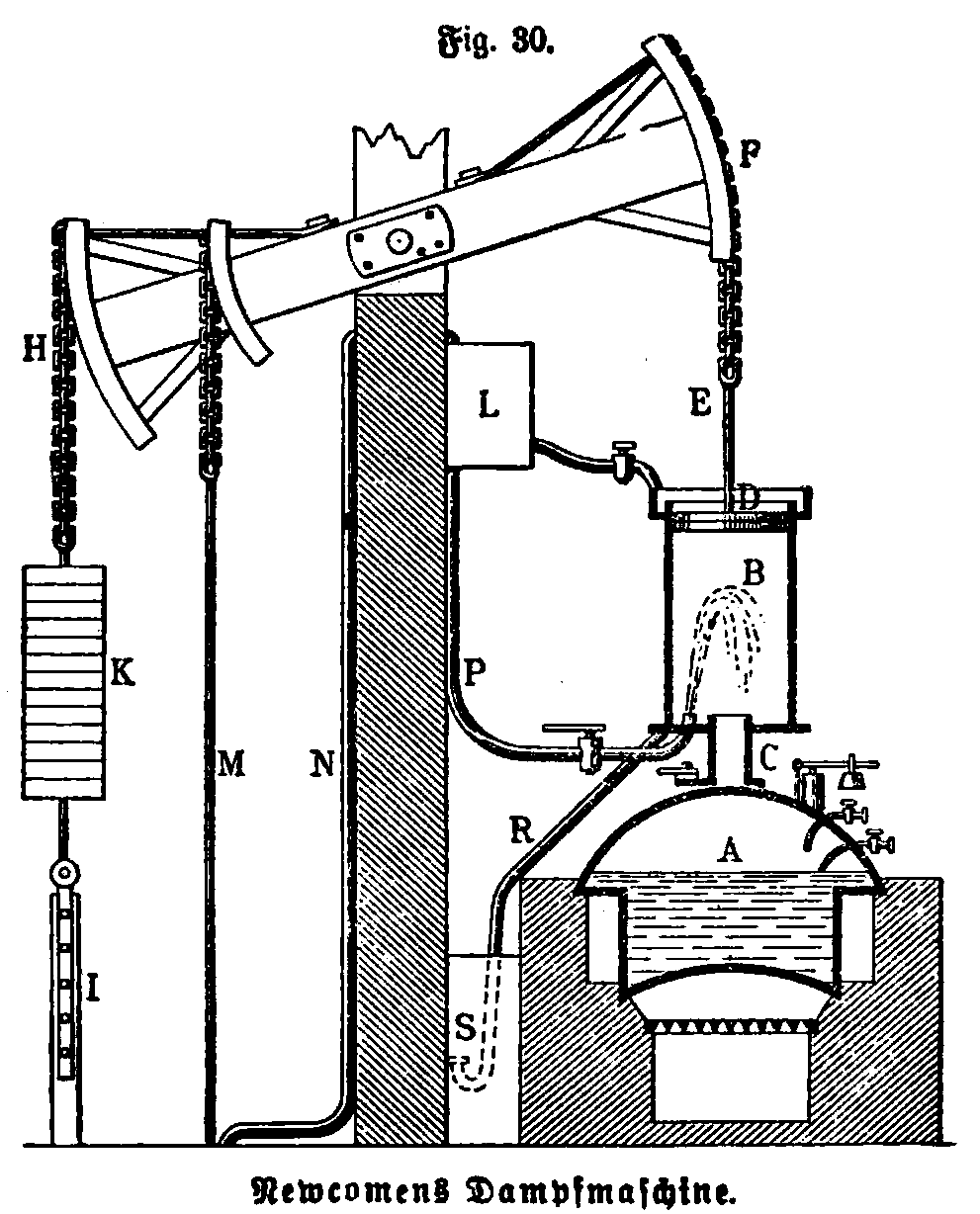
Newcomen's steam-powered atmospheric engine was the first practical piston steam engine; subsequent steam engines were to power the Industrial Revolution.

The development of the stationary steam engine was important in the Industrial Revolution; however, during its early period, most industrial power was supplied by water and wind. In Britain, by 1800 an estimated 10,000 horsepower was being supplied by steam. By 1815 steam power had grown to 210,000 hp.

The first commercially successful industrial use of steam power was patented by Thomas Savery in 1698. He constructed in London a low-lift combined vacuum and pressure water pump that generated about one horsepower (hp) and was used in waterworks and a few mines. The first successful piston steam engine was introduced by Thomas Newcomen before 1712. Newcomen engines were installed for draining hitherto unworkable deep mines, with the engine on the surface; these were large machines, requiring a significant amount of capital, and produced upwards of 3.5 kW (5 hp). They were extremely inefficient by modern standards, but when located where coal was cheap at pit heads, they opened up a great expansion in coal mining by allowing mines to go deeper. The engines spread to Hungary in 1722, then Germany and Sweden; 110 were built by 1733. In the 1770s John Smeaton built large examples and introduced improvements. 1,454 engines had been built by 1800. Despite their disadvantages, Newcomen engines were reliable and easy to maintain and continued to be used in coalfields until the early 19th century.

A fundamental change in working principles was brought about by James Watt, a Scotsman. With financial support from his business partner, the Englishman Matthew Boulton, he had succeeded by 1778 in perfecting his steam engine, which incorporated radical improvements, notably closing the upper part of the cylinder making the low-pressure steam drive the top of the piston instead of the atmosphere and the celebrated separate steam condenser chamber. The separate condenser did away with the cooling water that had been injected directly into the cylinder, which cooled the cylinder and wasted steam. These improvements increased engine efficiency so Boulton and Watt's engines used only 20–25% as much coal per horsepower-hour as Newcomen's. Boulton and Watt opened the Soho Foundry for the manufacture of such engines in 1795.

In 1783, the Watt steam engine had been fully developed into a double-acting rotative type, which meant it could be used to directly drive the rotary machinery of a factory or mill. Both of Watt's basic engine types were commercially successful, and by 1800 the firm Boulton and Watt had constructed 496 engines, with 164 driving reciprocating pumps, 24 serving blast furnaces, and 308 powering mill machinery; most of the engines generated from 3.5 to 7.5 kW (5 to 10 hp).

Until about 1800, the most common pattern of steam engine was the beam engine, built as an integral part of a stone or brick engine-house, but soon self-contained rotative engines were developed, such as the table engine. Around the start of the 19th century, at which time the Boulton and Watt patent expired, the Cornish engineer Richard Trevithick and the American Oliver Evans began to construct higher-pressure non-condensing steam engines, exhausting against the atmosphere. Watt himself had refrained from building any such engine for fear of its dangers, holding back the development of self-propelled machines. High pressure yielded an engine and boiler compact enough to be used on mobile road and rail locomotives and steamboats.

Small industrial power requirements continued to be provided by animal and human muscle until widespread electrification in the 20th century. These included crank-powered, treadle-powered, and horse-powered machinery in workshops and small plants.

=== Machine tools ===
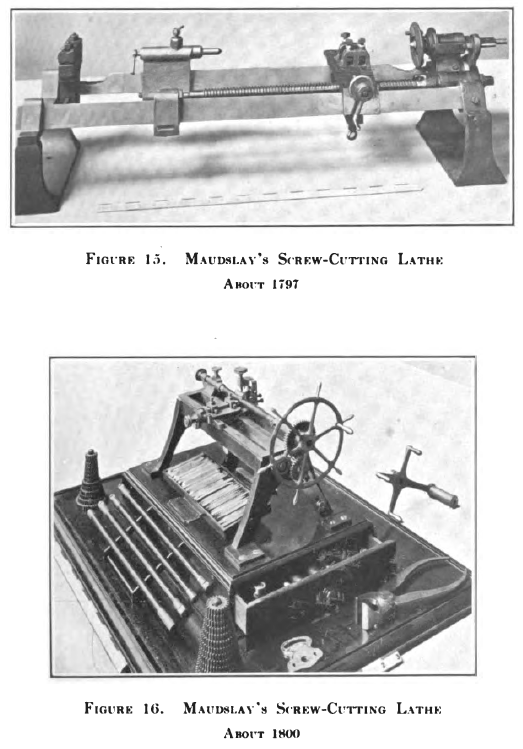
Maudslay's early screw-cutting lathes, developed in the late 1790s

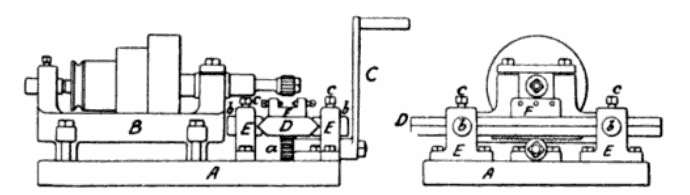
The Middletown milling machine, developed around 1818 by Robert Johnson and Simeon North

Over time it was shown that wooden components had the disadvantage of changing dimensions with temperature and humidity, and the joints tended to work loose. As the Industrial Revolution progressed machines with metal parts and frames, making them more common. Other uses of metal parts were in firearms and threaded fasteners, such as machine screws, bolts, and nuts. There was need for precision in making parts, to allow better working machinery, interchangeability of parts, and standardization of threaded fasteners.

The demand for metal parts led to the development of several machine tools. They have their origins in the tools developed in the 18th century by clock and scientific instrument makers, to enable them to batch-produce small mechanisms. Before machine tools, metal was worked manually using the basic hand tools: hammers, files, scrapers, saws, and chisels. Consequently, use of metal machine parts was kept to a minimum. Hand methods of production were laborious and costly, and precision was difficult to achieve.

The first large precision machine tool was the cylinder boring machine invented by John Wilkinson in 1774. It was designed to bore the large cylinders on steam engines. Wilkinson's machine was the first to use the principle of line-boring, where the tool is supported on both ends. The planing machine, the milling machine and the shaping machine were developed. Though the milling machine was invented at this time, it was not developed as a serious workshop tool until later. James Fox and Matthew Murray were manufacturers of machine tools who found success in exports and developed the planer around the same time as Richard Roberts.

Henry Maudslay, who trained a school of machine tool makers, was a mechanic who had been employed at the Royal Arsenal, Woolwich. He worked as an apprentice under Jan Verbruggen, who, in 1774, installed a horizontal boring machine which was the first industrial size lathe in the UK. Maudslay was hired by Joseph Bramah for the production of high-security metal locks that required precision craftsmanship. Bramah patented a lathe with similarities to the slide rest lathe, Maudslay perfected this lathe, which cut machine screws of different thread pitches. Before its invention, screws could not be cut with precision. The slide rest lathe was called one of history's most important inventions. Although it was not Maudslay's idea, he was the first to build a functional lathe using innovations of the lead screw, slide rest, and change gears. Maudslay set up a shop, and built the machinery for making ships' pulley blocks for the Royal Navy in the Portsmouth Block Mills. These machines were all-metal and the first for mass production and making components with interchangeability. The lessons Maudslay learned about the need for stability and precision he adapted to the development of machine tools, and he trained men to build on his work, such as Richard Roberts, Joseph Clement and Joseph Whitworth.

The techniques to make mass-produced metal parts of sufficient precision to be interchangeable is attributed to the U.S. Department of War which perfected interchangeable parts for firearms. In the half-century following the invention of the fundamental machine tools, the machine industry became the largest industrial sector of the U.S. economy.

=== Chemicals ===
Large-scale production of chemicals was an important development. The first of these was the production of sulphuric acid by the lead chamber process, invented by John Roebuck in 1746. He was able to increase the scale of the manufacture by replacing expensive glass vessels with larger, cheaper chambers made of riveted sheets of lead. Instead of a small amount, he was able to make around 50 kilograms (100 pounds) in each chamber, a tenfold increase.

The production of an alkali on a large scale became an important goal, and Nicolas Leblanc succeeded in 1791 in introducing a method for the production of sodium carbonate (soda ash). The Leblanc process was a reaction of sulfuric acid with sodium chloride to give sodium sulfate and hydrochloric acid. The sodium sulfate was heated with calcium carbonate and coal to give a mixture of sodium carbonate and calcium sulfide. Adding water separated the soluble sodium carbonate from the calcium sulfide. The process produced significant pollution, nonetheless, this synthetic soda ash proved economical compared to that from burning plants, and to potash (potassium carbonate) produced from hardwood ashes. Soda ash and sulphuric acid were important because they enabled the introduction of other inventions, replacing small-scale operations with more cost-effective and controllable processes. Sodium carbonate had uses in the glass, textile, soap, and paper industries. Early uses for sulfuric acid included pickling (removing rust from) iron and steel, and for bleaching cloth.

The development of bleaching powder (calcium hypochlorite) by chemist Charles Tennant in 1800, based on the discoveries of Claude Louis Berthollet, revolutionised the bleaching processes in the textile industry by reducing the time required for the traditional process then in use: repeated exposure to the sun in fields after soaking the textiles with alkali or sour milk. Tennant's St Rollox Chemical Works, Glasgow, became the world's largest chemical plant.

After 1860 the focus on chemical innovation was in dyestuffs, and Germany took leadership, building a strong chemical industry. Aspiring chemists flocked to German universities in 1860–1914 to learn the latest techniques. British scientists lacked research universities and did not train advanced students; instead, the practice was to hire German-trained chemists.

=== Concrete ===
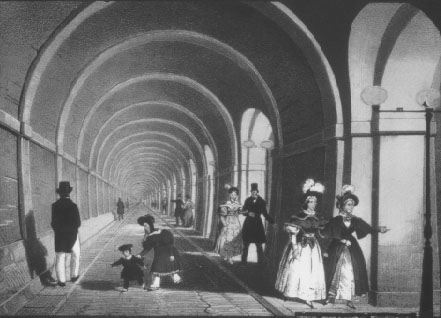
The Thames Tunnel, which opened in 1843; portland cement concrete was used in the world's first underwater tunnel.

In 1824 Joseph Aspdin, a British bricklayer turned builder, patented a chemical process for making portland cement, an important advance in the building trades. This process involves sintering clay and limestone to about 1,400 °C (2,552 °F), then grinding it into a fine powder which is mixed with water, sand and gravel to produce concrete. In the 1840s, Joseph's son William Aspdin developed his father's invention.

Portland cement concrete was used by English engineer Marc Isambard Brunel when constructing the Thames Tunnel, the world's first underwater tunnel. Portland cement concrete was used on a large scale in the construction of the London sewer system a generation later.

=== Gas lighting ===
Though others made a similar innovation, the large-scale introduction of gas lighting was the work of William Murdoch, an employee of Boulton & Watt. The process consisted of the large-scale gasification of coal in furnaces, purification of the gas, and its storage and distribution. The first gas lighting utilities were established in London between 1812 and 1820. They became one of the major consumers of coal in the UK. Gas lighting affected social and industrial organisation because it allowed factories and stores to remain open longer. Its introduction allowed nightlife to flourish in cities and towns as interiors and streets could be lighted on a larger scale than before.

=== Glass making ===
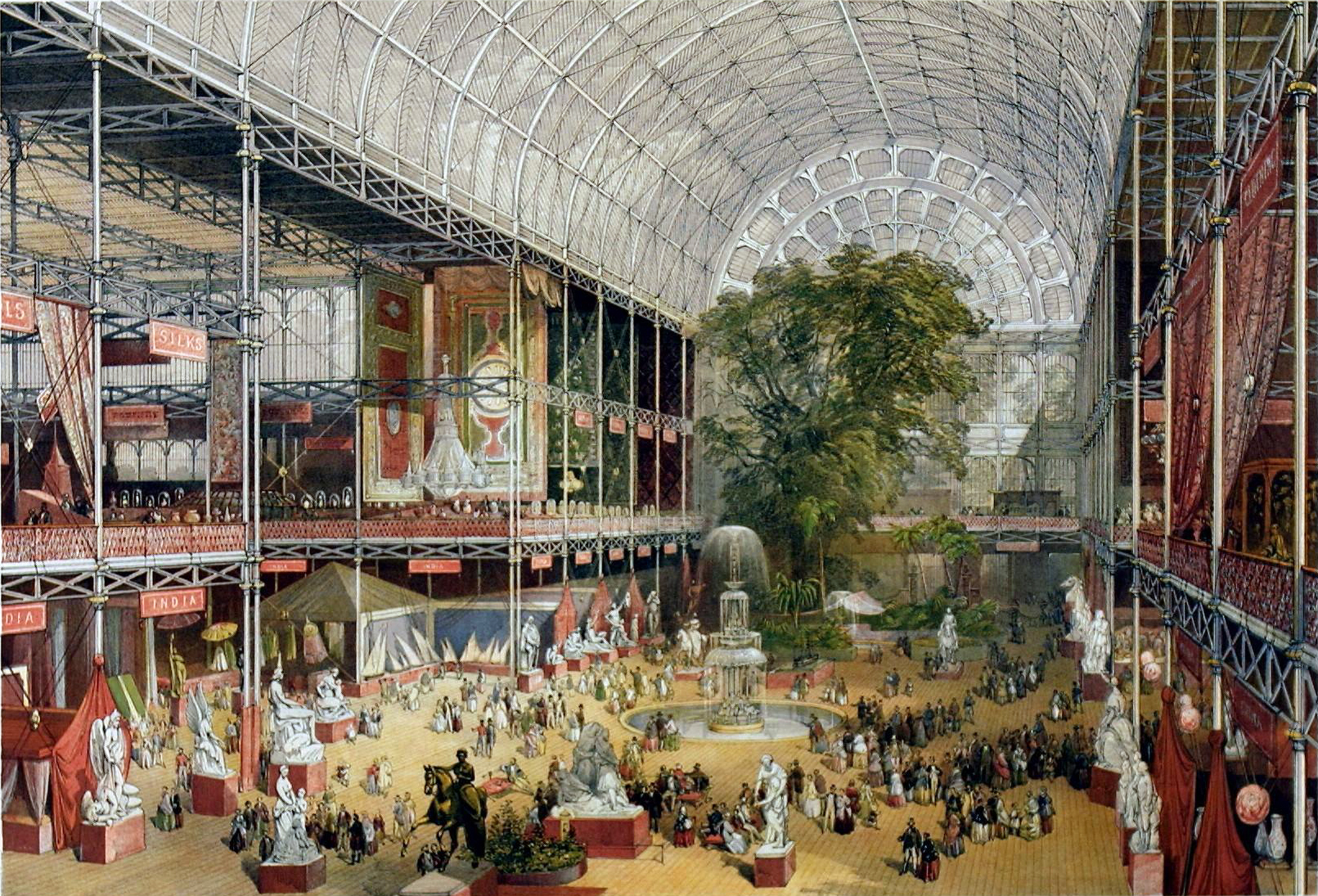
The Crystal Palace housed the Great Exhibition of 1851

Glass was made in ancient Greece and Rome. A new method of glass production, known as the cylinder process, was developed in Europe during the 19th century. In 1832 this process was used by the Chance Brothers to create sheet glass; they became the leading producers of window and plate glass. This advancement allowed for larger panes of glass to be created without interruption, thus freeing up the space planning in interiors as well as the fenestration of buildings. The Crystal Palace is a significant example of the use of sheet glass in a new and innovative structure.

=== Paper machine ===
A machine for making a continuous sheet of paper, on a loop of wire fabric, was patented in 1798 by Louis-Nicolas Robert in France. The paper machine is known as a Fourdrinier after the financiers, brothers Sealy and Henry Fourdrinier, who were stationers in London. The Fourdrinier machine is the predominant means of production today. The method of continuous production demonstrated by the paper machine influenced the development of continuous rolling of iron, steel and other continuous production processes.

=== Agriculture ===
The British Agricultural Revolution raised crop yields and released labour for industrial employment, although per-capita food supply in much of Europe remained stagnant until the late 18th century. Key innovations included Jethro Tull's early 18th-century mechanical seed drill (1701), which ensured more even sowing and depth control, Joseph Foljambe's iron Rotherham plough (c. 1730) and Andrew Meikle's threshing machine (1784), which reduced manual labour requirements. Hand threshing with a flail, was a laborious job that had taken about one-quarter of agricultural labour, lower labour requirements resulted in lower wages and fewer labourers, who faced near starvation, leading to the 1830 Swing Riots.

=== Mining ===
Coal mining in Britain started early. Before the steam engine, pits were often shallow bell pits following a seam of coal along the surface, which were abandoned as the coal was extracted. If the geology was favourable, the coal was mined by means of an adit or drift mine driven into the side of a hill. Shaft mining was done in some areas, but the limiting factor was the problem of removing water. It could be done by hauling buckets up the shaft or to a sough (a tunnel driven into a hill to drain a mine). The water had to be discharged into a stream or ditch at a level where it could flow away.

Introduction of the steam pump by Thomas Savery in 1698 and the Newcomen steam engine in 1712 facilitated removal of water and enabled deeper shafts, enabling more coal to be extracted. These developments had begun before the Industrial Revolution, but the adoption of Smeaton's improvements to the Newcomen engine, followed by Watt's steam engines from the 1770s, reduced the fuel costs, making mines more profitable. The Cornish engine, developed in the 1810s, was more efficient than the Watt engine.

Coal mining was dangerous owing to the presence of firedamp in coal seams. A degree of safety was provided by the safety lamp invented in 1816 by Sir Humphry Davy, and independently by George Stephenson. However, the lamps proved a false dawn because they became unsafe quickly and provided weak light. Firedamp explosions continued, often setting off coal dust explosions, so casualties grew during the 19th century. Conditions were very poor, with a high casualty rate from rock falls.

=== Transportation ===
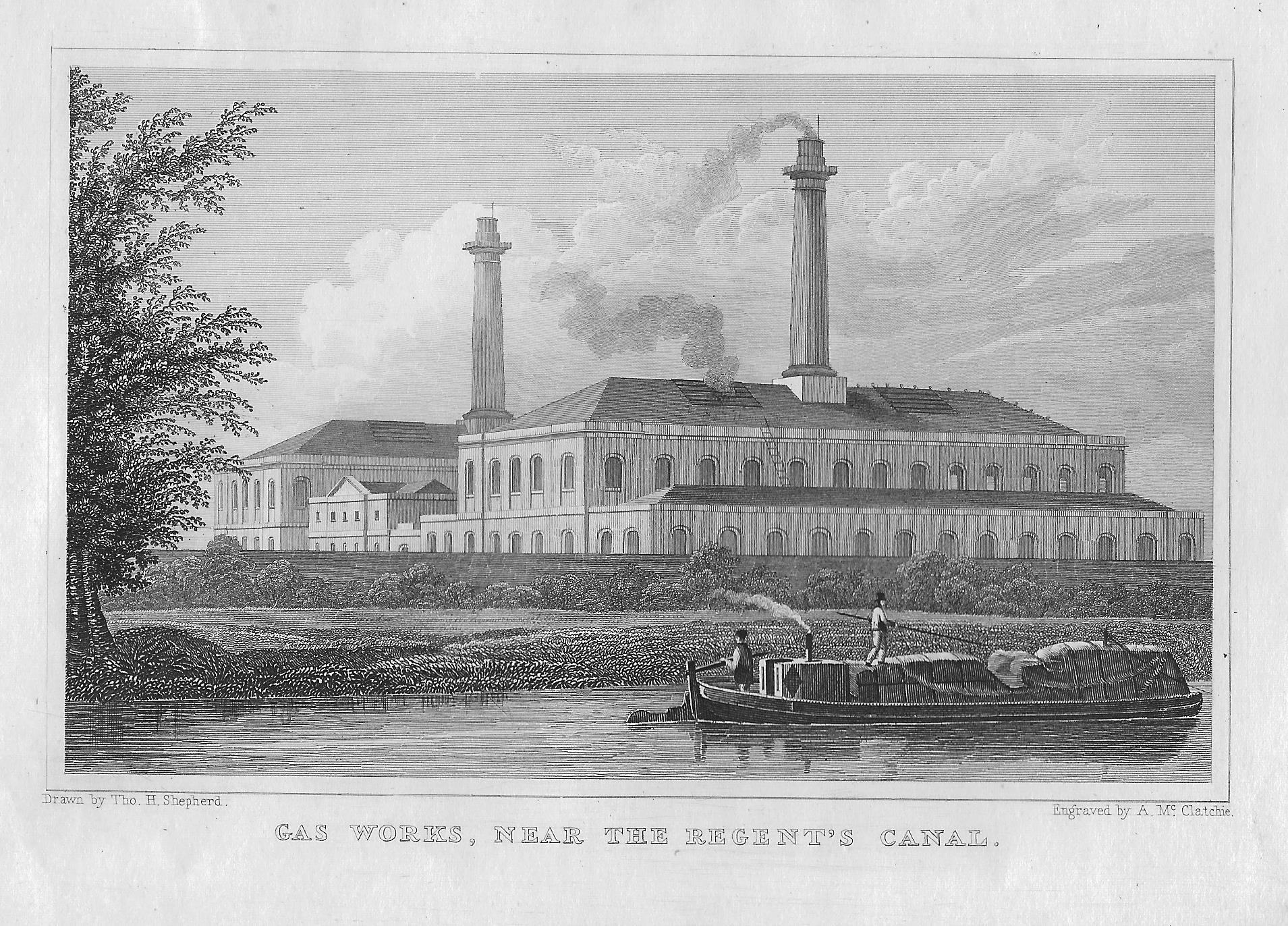
Imperial Gas Company's gasworks on the Regent's Canal, 1828

At the beginning of the Industrial Revolution, inland transport was by navigable rivers and roads, with coastal vessels employed to move heavy goods. Wagonways were used for conveying coal to rivers for further shipment, but canals had not yet been widely constructed. Animals supplied all motive power on land, with sails providing motive power on the sea. The first horse railways were introduced toward the end of the 18th century, with steam locomotives introduced in the early 19th century. Improving sailing technologies boosted speed by 50% between 1750 and 1830.

The Industrial Revolution improved Britain's transport infrastructure with turnpike road, waterway and rail networks. Raw materials and finished products could be moved quicker and cheaper than before. Improved transport allowed ideas to spread quickly.

==== Canals and improved waterways ====
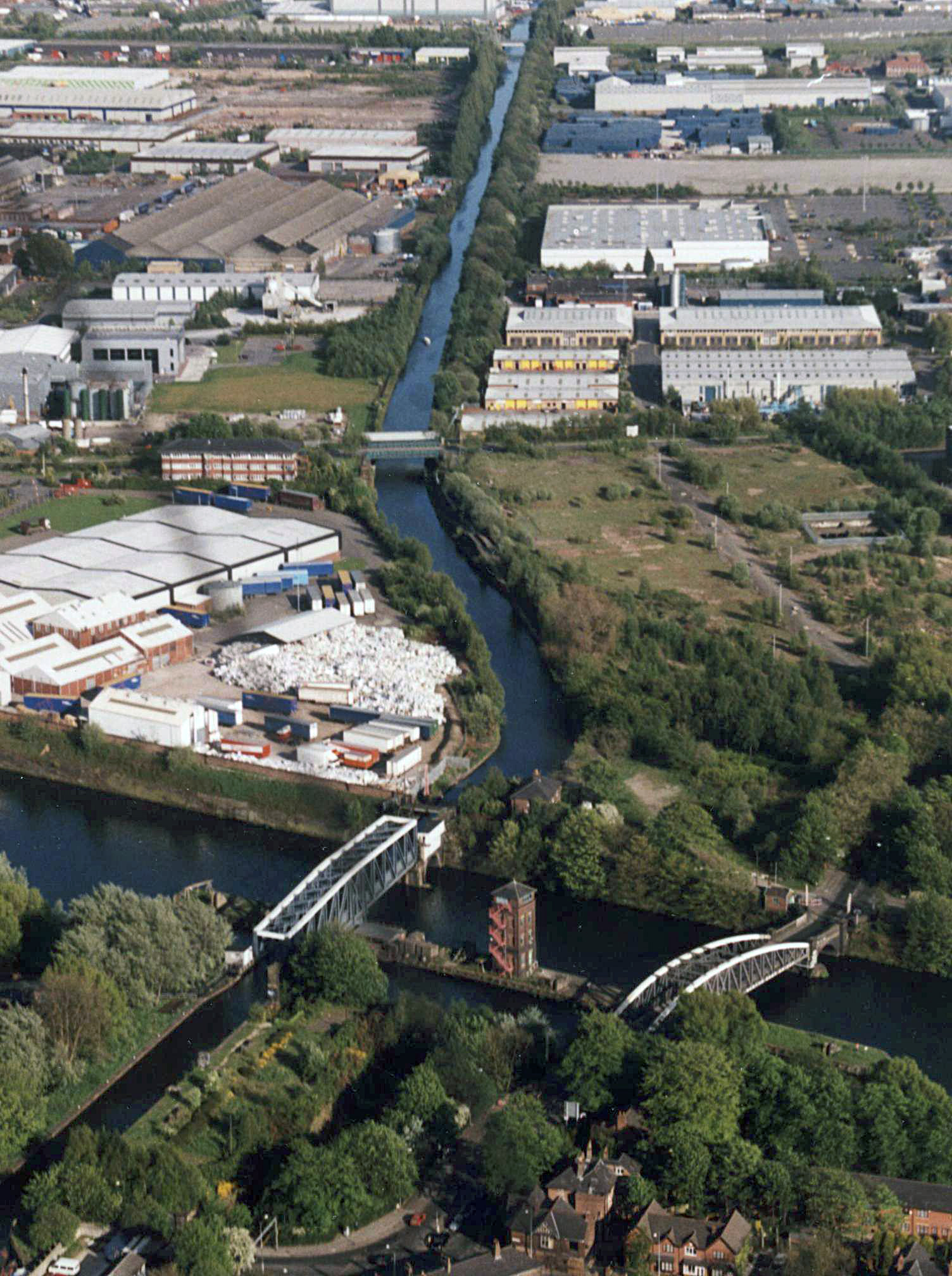
The Bridgewater Canal, which proved very commercially successful, crossed the Manchester Ship Canal, one of the last canals to be built.

Before and during the Industrial Revolution navigation on British rivers was improved by removing obstructions, straightening curves, widening and deepening, and building navigation locks. Britain had over 1,600 kilometres (1,000 mi) of navigable rivers and streams by 1750. Canals and waterways allowed bulk materials to be economically transported long distances inland. This was because a horse could pull a barge with a tens of times larger than could be drawn in a cart.

Canals began to be built in the UK in the late 18th century to link major manufacturing centres. Known for its huge commercial success, the Bridgewater Canal in North West England, was opened in 1761 and mostly funded by The 3rd Duke of Bridgewater. From Worsley to the rapidly growing town of Manchester its construction cost £168,000 (£22,103,210 as of 2013), but its advantages over land and river transport meant that within one year, the coal price in Manchester fell by half. This success inspired Canal Mania, canals were hastily built with the aim of replicating the commercial success of Bridgewater, the most notable being the Leeds and Liverpool Canal and the Thames and Severn Canal which opened in 1774 and 1789 respectively.

By the 1820s a national network was in existence. Canal construction served as a model for the organisation and methods used to construct the railways. They were largely superseded by the railways from the 1840s. The last major canal built in the UK was the Manchester Ship Canal, which upon opening in 1894 was the world's largest ship canal, and opened Manchester as a port. However, it never achieved the commercial success its sponsors hoped for and signalled canals as a dying transport mode in an age dominated by railways, which were quicker and often cheaper. Britain's canal network, and its mill buildings, is one of the most enduring features of the Industrial Revolution to be seen in Britain.

==== Roads ====
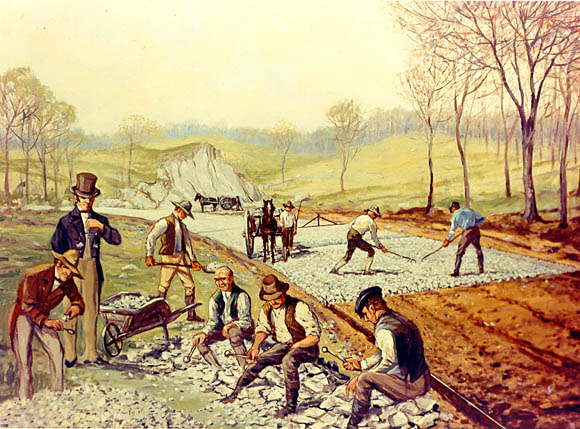
Construction of the first macadam road in the U.S. in 1823. In the foreground, workers are breaking stones "so as not to exceed 6 ounces in weight or to pass a two-inch ring".

France was known for having an excellent road system at this time; however, most roads on the European continent and in the UK were in bad condition, dangerously rutted. Much of the original British road system was poorly maintained by local parishes, but from the 1720s turnpike trusts were set up to charge tolls and maintain some roads. Increasing numbers of main roads were turnpiked from the 1750s: almost every main road in England and Wales was the responsibility of a turnpike trust. New engineered roads were built by John Metcalf, Thomas Telford and John McAdam, with the first 'macadam' stretch of road being Marsh Road at Ashton Gate, Bristol, England in 1816. The first macadam road in the U.S. was the "Boonsborough Turnpike Road" between Hagerstown and Boonsboro, Maryland in 1823.

The major turnpikes radiated from London and were the means by which the Royal Mail was able to reach the rest of the country. Heavy goods transport on these roads was by slow, broad-wheeled carts hauled by teams of horses. Lighter goods were conveyed by smaller carts or teams of packhorse. Stagecoaches carried the rich, and the less wealthy rode on carriers carts. Productivity of road transport increased greatly during the Industrial Revolution, and the cost of travel fell dramatically. Between 1690 and 1840 productivity tripled for long-distance carrying and increased four-fold in stage coaching.

==== Railways ====
A portrait depicting the opening of the Liverpool and Manchester Railway in 1830, the first inter-city railway in the world and which spawned Railway Mania due to its success

Railways were made practical by the widespread introduction of inexpensive puddled iron after 1800, the rolling mill for making rails, and the development of the high-pressure steam engine. Reduced friction was a major reason for the success of railways compared to wagons. This was demonstrated on an iron plate-covered wooden tramway in 1805 at Croydon, England.

A good horse on an ordinary turnpike road can draw two thousand pounds, or one ton. A party of gentlemen were invited to witness the experiment, that the superiority of the new road might be established by ocular demonstration. Twelve wagons were loaded with stones, till each wagon weighed three tons, and the wagons were fastened together. A horse was then attached, which drew the wagons with ease, six miles [10 km] in two hours, having stopped four times, in order to show he had the power of starting, as well as drawing his great load.

Wagonways for moving coal in the mining areas had started in the 17th century and were often associated with canal or river systems for the further movement. These were horse-drawn or relied on gravity, with a stationary steam engine to haul the wagons back to the top of the incline. The first applications of steam locomotive were on wagon or plate ways. Horse-drawn public railways begin in the early 19th century when improvements to pig and wrought iron production lowered costs.

Steam locomotives began being built after the introduction of high-pressure steam engines, after the expiration of the Boulton and Watt patent in 1800. High-pressure engines exhausted used steam to the atmosphere, doing away with the condenser and cooling water. They were much lighter and smaller in size for a given horsepower than the stationary condensing engines. A few of these early locomotives were used in mines. Steam-hauled public railways began with the Stockton and Darlington Railway in 1825.

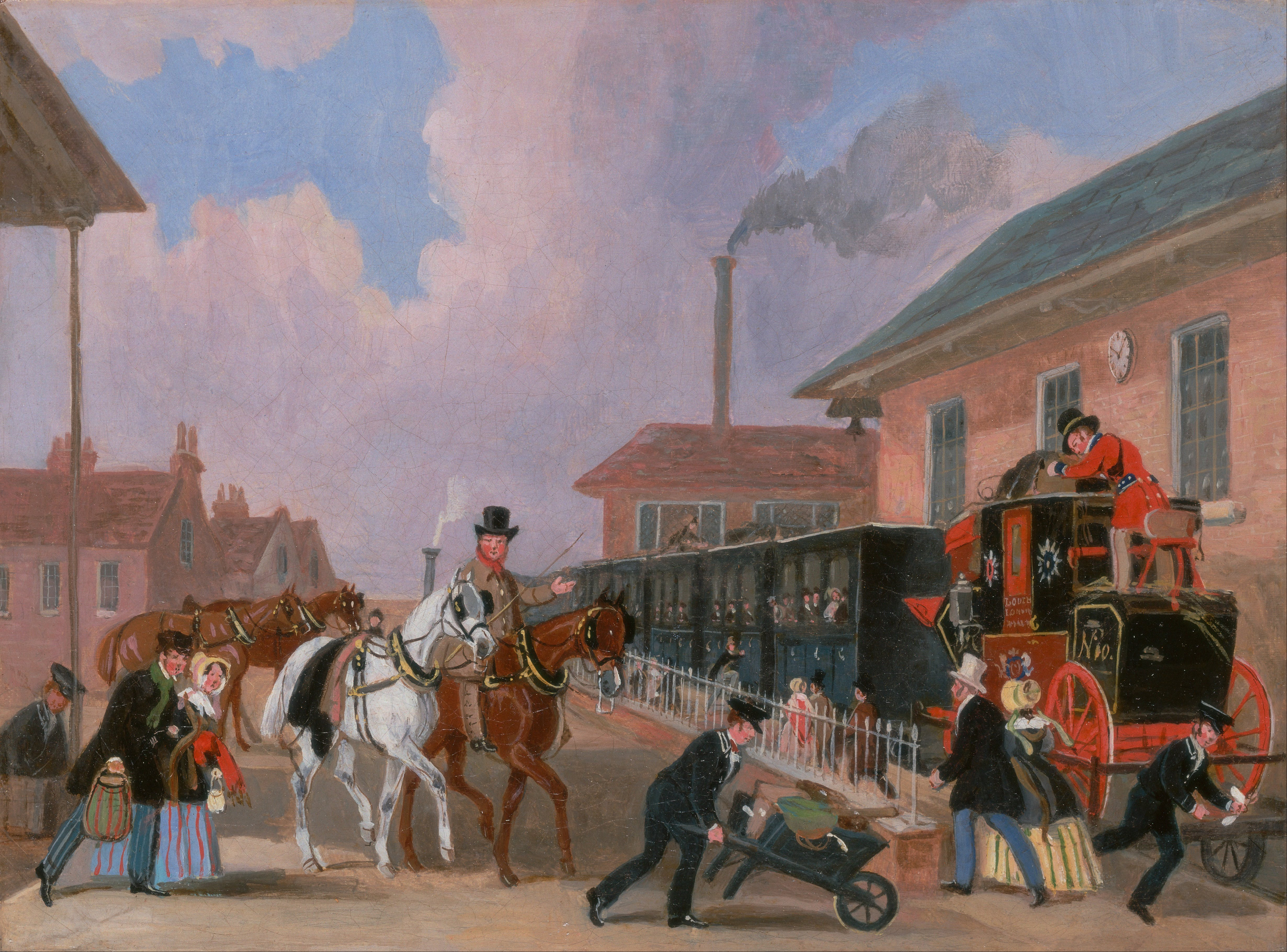
The Louth-London Royal Mail travelling by train from Peterborough East, 1845

The rapid introduction of railways followed the 1829 Rainhill trials, which demonstrated Robert Stephenson's successful locomotive design and the 1828 development of hot blast, which dramatically reduced the fuel consumption of making iron and increased the capacity of the blast furnace. On 15 September 1830, the Liverpool and Manchester Railway, the first inter-city railway in the world, was opened. The railway was engineered by Joseph Locke and George Stephenson, linked the rapidly expanding industrial town of Manchester with the port of Liverpool. The railway became highly successful, transporting passengers and freight.

The success of the inter-city railway, particularly in the transport of freight and commodities, led to Railway Mania. Construction of major railways connecting the larger cities and towns began in the 1830s, but only gained momentum at the very end of the first Industrial Revolution. After many of the workers had completed the railways, they did not return to the countryside but remained in the cities, providing additional workers for the factories.

== Social effects ==
The Industrial Revolution effectively asked the social question, demanding new ideas for managing large groups. Visible poverty, growing population and materialistic wealth, caused tensions between the richest and poorest. These tensions were sometimes violently released and led to philosophical ideas such as socialism, communism and anarchism.

=== Factory system ===
Prior to the Industrial Revolution, most were employed in agriculture as self-employed farmers, tenants, landless agricultural labourers. It was common for families to spin yarn, weave cloth and make their clothing. Households also spun and wove for market production. At the beginning of the Industrial Revolution, India, China, and regions of Iraq and elsewhere in Asia and the Middle East produced most of the world's cotton cloth, while Europeans produced wool and linen goods.

In Great Britain in the 16th century, the putting-out system was practised, by which farmers and townspeople produced goods for a market in their homes, often described as cottage industry. Merchant capitalists typically provided the raw materials, paid workers by the piece, and were responsible for sales. Embezzlement of supplies by workers and poor quality were common. The logistical effort in procuring and distributing raw materials and picking up finished goods were also limitations.

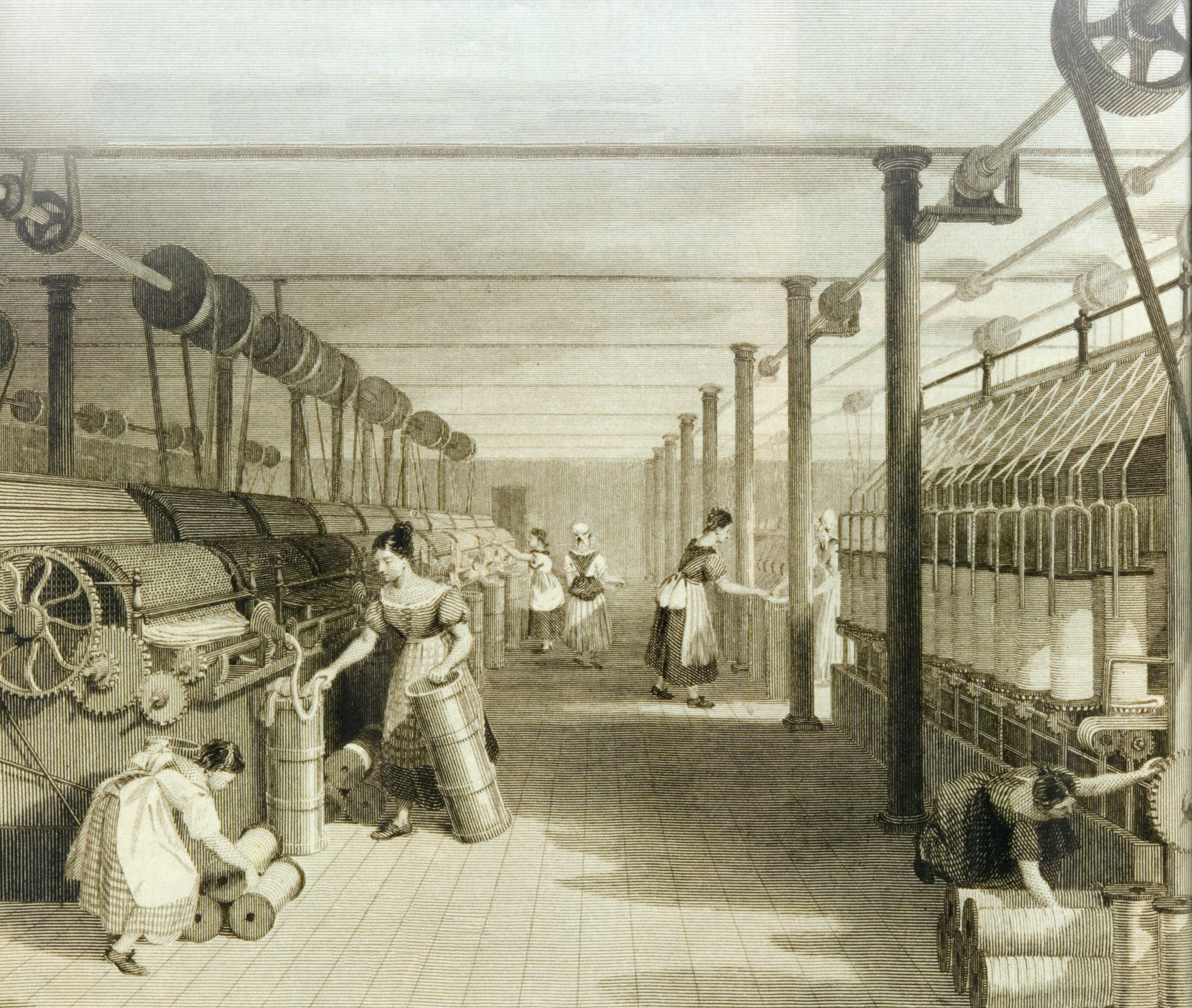
Manchester cotton mill c. 1834

Some early spinning and weaving machinery, such as a 40 spindle jenny for about six pounds in 1792, was affordable for cottagers. Later machinery such as spinning frames, spinning mules and power looms were expensive, giving rise to capitalist ownership of factories.

Most textile factory workers during the Industrial Revolution were unmarried women and children, including many orphans. They worked for 12–14 hours with only Sundays off. It was common for women to take factory jobs seasonally during slack periods of farm work. Lack of adequate transportation, long hours, and poor pay made it difficult to recruit and retain workers. The change in the social relationship of the factory worker compared to farmers and cottagers was viewed unfavourably by Karl Marx; however, he recognized the increase in productivity from technology.

=== Standards of living ===
Some economists, such as Robert Lucas Jr., say the real effect of the Industrial Revolution was that "for the first time in history, the living standards of the masses of ordinary people have begun to undergo sustained growth ... Nothing remotely like this economic behaviour is mentioned by the classical economists, even as a theoretical possibility."

Others argue that while growth of the economy was unprecedented, living standards for most did not grow meaningfully until the late 19th century and workers' living standards declined under early capitalism. Some studies estimate that wages in Britain only increased 15% between the 1780s and 1850s and life expectancy did not dramatically increase until the 1870s. Average height declined during the Industrial Revolution, because nutrition was decreasing. Life expectancy of children increased dramatically: the percentage of Londoners who died before the age of five decreased from 75% in 1730–49, to 32% in 1810–29. The effects on living conditions have been controversial and were debated by historians from the 1950s to the 1980s. Between 1813 and 1913, there was a significant increase in wages.

==== Food and nutrition ====
Chronic hunger and malnutrition were the norms for most, including in Britain and France, until the late 19th century. Until about 1750, malnutrition limited life expectancy in France to 35, and 40 in Britain. The US population was adequately fed, taller, and had a life expectancy of 45–50, though this slightly declined by the mid 19th century. Food consumption per person also declined during an episode known as the Antebellum Puzzle. Food supply in Great Britain was adversely affected by the Corn Laws (1815–46) which imposed tariffs on imported grain. The laws were enacted to keep prices high to benefit domestic producers. The Corn Laws were repealed in the early years of the Great Irish Famine.

The initial technologies of the Industrial Revolution, such as mechanized textiles, iron and coal, did little, if anything, to lower food prices. In Britain and the Netherlands, food supply increased before the Industrial Revolution with better agricultural practices; however, population grew as well.

==== Housing ====
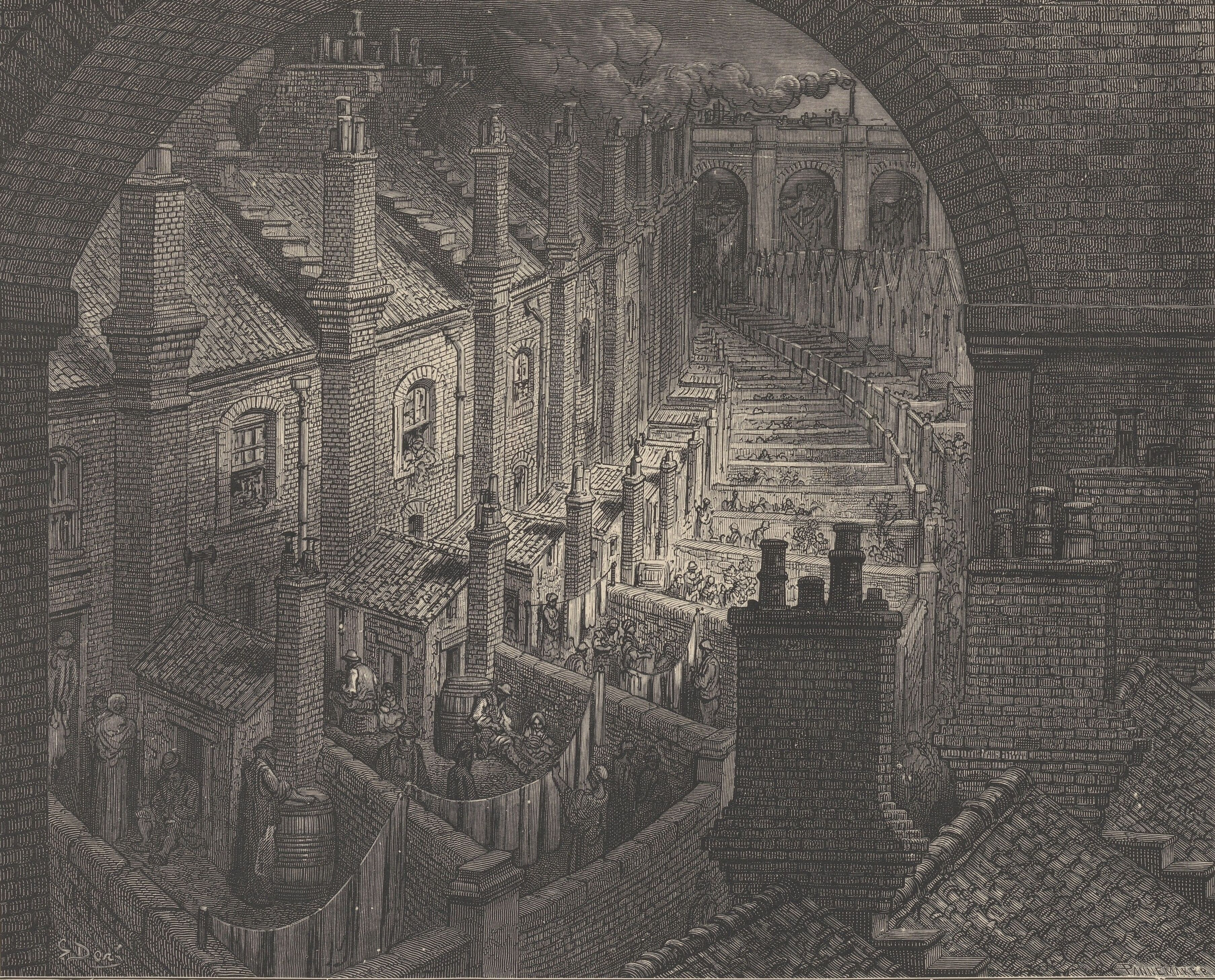
Housing in London c. 1870s by Gustave Doré

Rapid population growth included the new industrial and manufacturing cities, as well as service centers such as Edinburgh and London. The critical factor was financing, which was handled by building societies that dealt directly with large contracting firms. Private renting from housing landlords was the dominant tenure, this was usually of advantage to tenants. People moved in so rapidly there was not enough capital to build adequate housing, so low-income newcomers squeezed into overcrowded slums. Clean water, sanitation, and public health facilities were inadequate; the death rate was high, especially infant mortality, and tuberculosis among young adults. Cholera from polluted water and typhoid were endemic. Unlike rural areas, there were no famines such that which devastated Ireland in the 1840s.

A large exposé literature grew up condemning the unhealthy conditions. The most famous publication was by a founder of the socialist movement. In The Condition of the Working Class in England in 1844, Friedrich Engels describes backstreets of Manchester and other mill towns, where people lived in shanties and shacks, some not enclosed, some with dirt floors. These shanty towns had narrow walkways between irregularly shaped lots and dwellings. There were no sanitary facilities. Population density was extremely high. However, not everyone lived in such poor conditions. The Industrial Revolution created a middle class of businessmen, clerks, foremen, and engineers who lived in much better conditions.

Conditions improved over the 19th century with new public health acts regulating things such as sewage, hygiene, and home construction. In the introduction of his 1892 edition, Engels noted most of the conditions had greatly improved. For example, the Public Health Act 1875 led to the more sanitary byelaw terraced house.

==== Water and sanitation ====
Pre-industrial water supply relied on gravity systems, pumping water was done by water wheels, and pipes were made of wood. Steam-powered pumps and iron pipes allowed widespread piping of water to horse watering troughs and households.

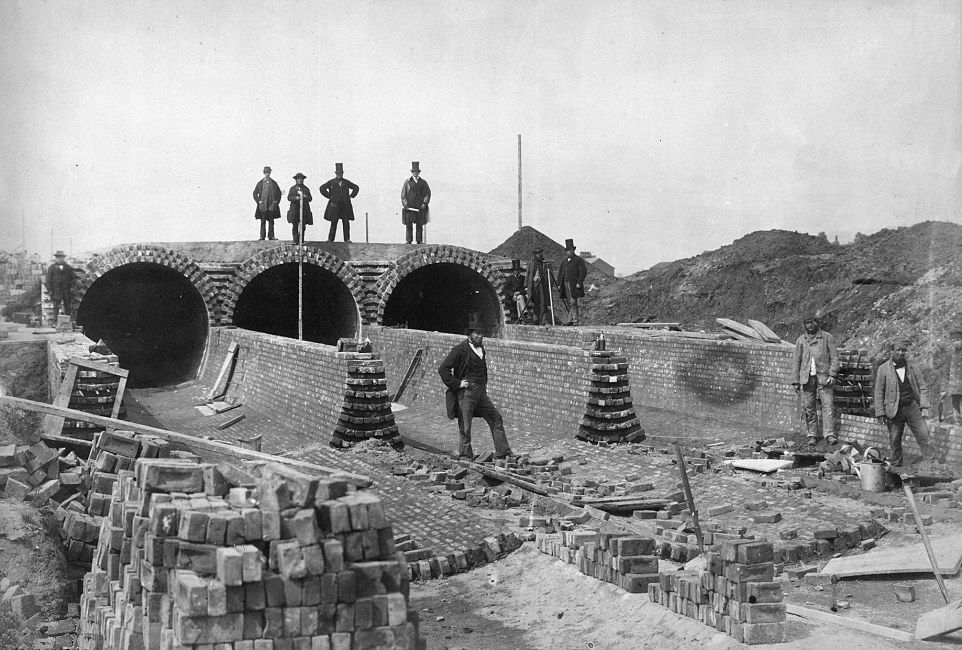
The London sewer system being built in 1860 led by the chief engineer Joseph Bazalgette (top right)

Engels' book describes how untreated sewage created awful odours and turned the rivers green in industrial cities. In 1854 John Snow traced a cholera outbreak in Soho, London to fecal contamination of a public water well by a home cesspit. Snow's finding that cholera could be spread by contaminated water took years to be accepted, but led to fundamental changes in the design of public water and waste systems. In 1855 the chemist Michael Faraday wrote a letter to The Times on the subject of the foul condition of the River Thames (raw sewerage went directly into the Thames), and in response to the exacerbation of sanitary conditions brought on by heavy industrialisation and urbanisation (London's population more than doubled between 1800 and 1850, making it by far the largest in the world), the modern sewage system was built in London by the Metropolitan Board of Works led by its chief engineer Joseph Bazalgette. The London sewer system began construction in 1859 and included 82 miles (132 km) of main and 1,100 miles (1,800 km) of street sewers that diverted waste to the Thames Estuary, and by the 1890s it would feature the revolutionary biological treatment of sewage to oxidise the waste.

=== Literacy ===
In the 18th century, there was relatively high literacy among farmers in England and Scotland. This permitted the recruitment of literate craftsmen, skilled workers, foremen, and managers who supervised textile factories and coal mines. Much of the labour was unskilled, and especially in textile mills children as young as eight proved useful in handling chores and adding to family income. Children were taken out of school to work alongside their parents in the factories. However, by the mid-19th century, unskilled labour forces were common in Western Europe, and British industry moved upscale, needing more engineers and skilled workers who could handle technical instructions and handle complex situations. Literacy was essential to be hired. A senior government official told Parliament in 1870:

Upon the speedy provision of elementary education depends are industrial prosperity. It is of no use trying to give technical teaching to our citizens without elementary education; uneducated labourers—and many of our labourers are utterly uneducated—are, for the most part, unskilled labourers, and if we leave our work–folk any longer unskilled, notwithstanding their strong sinews and determined energy, they will become overmatched in the competition of the world.

The invention of the paper machine and the application of steam power to the industrial processes of printing supported a massive expansion of newspaper and pamphlet publishing, which contributed to rising literacy and demands for mass political participation.

=== Clothing and consumer goods ===
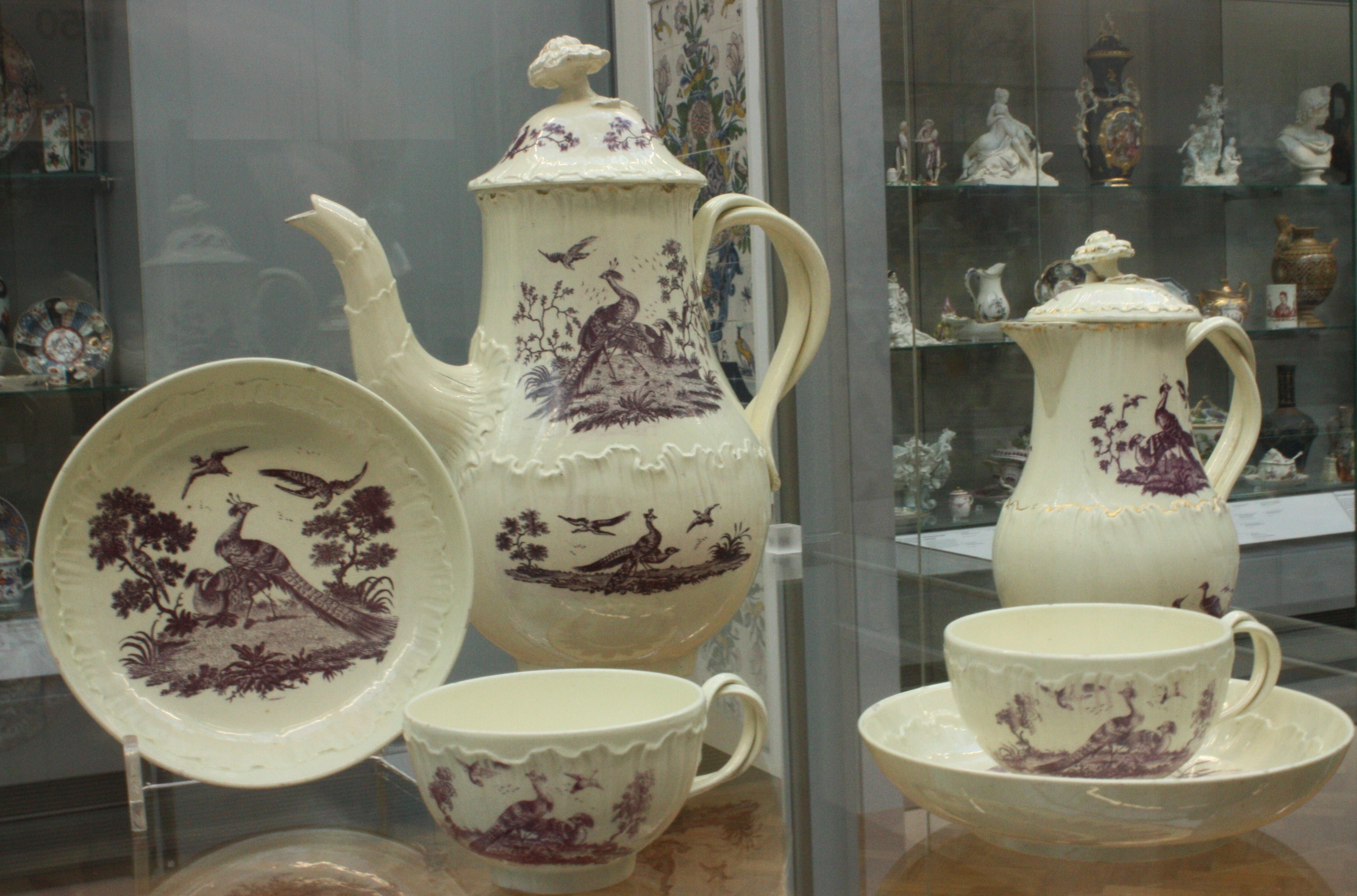
Wedgwood tea and coffee service, transfer-printed, a much cheaper alternative to hand-painted porcelain

Consumers benefited from falling prices for clothing and household articles such as cast iron cooking utensils, and in the following decades, stoves for cooking and space heating. Coffee, tea, sugar, tobacco, and chocolate became affordable to many in Europe. The consumer revolution in England from the 17th to the mid-18th century had seen a marked increase in the consumption and variety of luxury goods and products by individuals from different economic and social backgrounds. With improvements in transport and manufacturing technology, opportunities for buying and selling became faster and more efficient. The expanding textile trade in the north of England meant the three-piece suit became affordable to the masses. Founded by potter and retail entrepreneur Josiah Wedgwood in 1759, Wedgwood fine china and porcelain tableware became a common feature on dining tables. Rising prosperity and social mobility in the 18th century increased those with disposable income for consumption, and the marketing of goods for individuals, as opposed households, started to appear.

With the rapid growth of towns and cities, shopping became an important part of everyday life. Window shopping and the purchase of goods became a cultural activity...and many exclusive shops were opened in elegant urban districts: in the Strand and Piccadilly in London, for example, and in spa towns such as Bath and Harrogate. Prosperity and expansion in manufacturing industries such as pottery and metalware increased consumer choice dramatically. Where once labourers ate from metal platters with wooden implements, ordinary workers now dined on Wedgwood porcelain. Consumers came to demand an array of new household goods and furnishings: metal knives and forks...rugs, carpets, mirrors, cooking ranges, pots, pans, watches, clocks, and a dizzying array of furniture. The age of mass consumption had arrived.

— "Georgian Britain, The rise of consumerism", Matthew White, British Library.

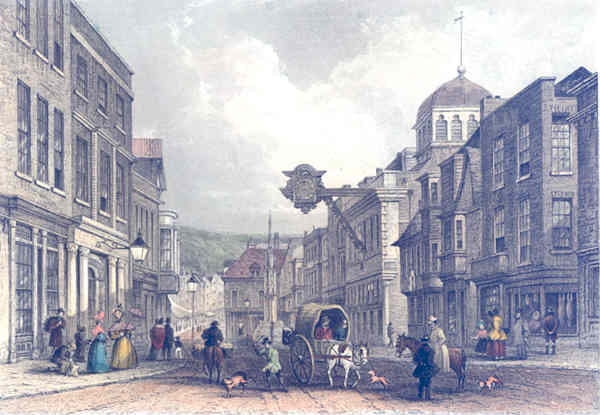
Winchester's High Street in 1853; the number of High Streets, the primary street for retail in Britain in towns and cities rapidly grew in the 18th century.

New businesses appeared in towns and cities throughout Britain. Confectionery was one such industry that saw rapid expansion. According to food historian Polly Russell: "chocolate and biscuits became products for the masses...By the mid-19th century, sweet biscuits were an affordable indulgence and business was booming. Manufacturers...transformed from small family-run businesses into state-of-the-art operations". In 1847 Fry's of Bristol produced the first chocolate bar. Their competitor Cadbury, of Birmingham, was the first to commercialize the association between confectionery and romance when they produced a heart-shaped box of chocolates for Valentine's Day in 1868. The department store became a common feature in major High Streets; one of the first was opened in 1796 by Harding, Howell & Co. on Pall Mall, London. The oldest toy store, Hamleys, opened in London in 1760. In the 1860s, fish and chip shops first appeared to satisfy the needs of the growing industrial population. Street sellers also became common in an increasingly urbanized country. Matthew White: "Crowds swarmed in every thoroughfare. Scores of street sellers 'cried' merchandise from place to place, advertising the wealth of goods and services on offer. Milkmaids, orange sellers, fishwives and piemen...walked the streets offering their various wares for sale, while knife grinders and the menders of broken chairs and furniture could be found on street corners". A soft drinks company, R. White's Lemonade, began in 1845 by selling drinks in London in a wheelbarrow.

Increased literacy, industrialisation, and the railway created a market for cheap literature for the masses and the ability for it to be circulated on a large scale. Penny dreadfuls were created in the 1830s to meet this demand, "Britain's first taste of mass-produced popular culture for the young", and "the Victorian equivalent of video games". By the 1860s and 70s more than one million boys' periodicals were sold per week. Labelled an "authorpreneur" by The Paris Review, Charles Dickens used the innovations of the era to sell books: new printing presses, enhanced advertising revenues, and the railways. His first novel, The Pickwick Papers (1836), became a phenomenon, its unprecedented success sparking spin-offs and merchandise ranging from Pickwick cigars, playing cards, china figurines, Sam Weller puzzles, Weller boot polish and jokebooks. Nicholas Dames in The Atlantic writes, "Literature" is not a big enough category for Pickwick. It defined its own, a new one that we have learned to call "entertainment". Urbanisation led to development of the music hall in the 1850s, with the newly created urban communities, cut off from their cultural roots, requiring new and accessible forms of entertainment.

In 1861, Welsh entrepreneur Pryce Pryce-Jones formed the first mail order business, an idea which changed retail. Selling Welsh flannel, he created catalogues, with customers able to order by mail for the first time—this following the Uniform Penny Post in 1840 and invention of the postage stamp (Penny Black) with a charge of one penny for carriage between any two places in the UK irrespective of distance—and the goods were delivered via the new railway system. As the railways expanded overseas, so did his business.

=== Population increase ===
The Industrial Revolution was the first time there was a simultaneous increase in population and per person income. The population of England and Wales, which had remained steady at six million in 1700–40, rose dramatically afterwards. England's population doubled from 8.3 million in 1801 to 17 million in 1850 and, by 1901, had doubled again to 31 million. Improved conditions led to the population of Britain increasing from 10 million to 30 million in the 19th century. Europe's population increased from 100 million in 1700 to 400 million by 1900.

Between 1815 and 1939, 20% of Europe's population left home, pushed by poverty, a rapidly growing population, and the displacement of peasant farming and artisan manufacturing. They were pulled abroad by the enormous demand for labour, ready availability of land, and cheap transportation. Many did not find a satisfactory life, leading 7 million to return to Europe. This mass migration had large demographic effects: in 1800, less than 1% of the world population consisted of overseas Europeans and their descendants; by 1930, they represented 11%. The Americas felt the brunt of this huge emigration, largely concentrated in the US.

=== Urbanization ===
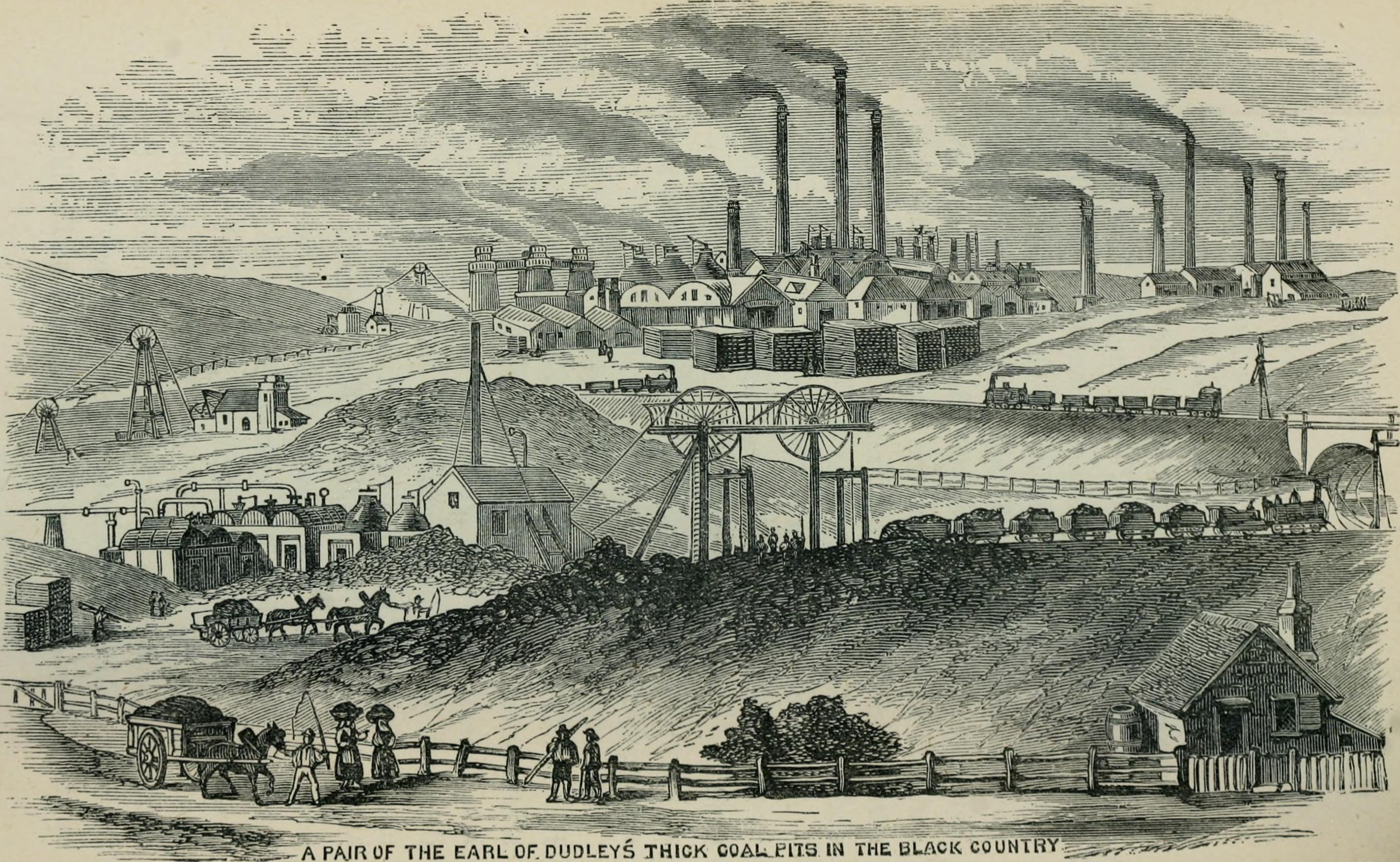
The Black Country west of Birmingham, England

The growth of the industry since the late 18th century led to massive urbanisation and the rise of new great cities, first in Europe, then elsewhere, as new opportunities brought huge numbers of migrants from rural communities into urban areas. In 1800, only 3% of humans lived in cities, compared to 50% by 2000. Manchester had a population of 10,000 in 1717, by 1911 it had burgeoned to 2.3 million.

=== Effect on women and family life ===
Women's historians have debated the effect of the Industrial Revolution and capitalism on the status of women. Taking a pessimistic view, Alice Clark argues that when capitalism arrived in 17th-century England, it lowered the status of women as they lost much of their economic importance. Clark argues that in 16th-century England, women were engaged in many aspects of industry and agriculture. The home was a central unit of production, and women played a vital role in running farms and some trades and landed estates. Their economic role gave them a sort of equality. However, Clark argues, as capitalism expanded, there was more division of labour with husbands taking paid labour jobs outside the home, and wives reduced to unpaid household work. Middle- and upper-class women were confined to an idle domestic existence, supervising servants; lower-class women were forced to take poorly paid jobs. Capitalism, therefore, had a negative effect on powerful women.

In a more positive interpretation, Ivy Pinchbeck argues capitalism created the conditions for women's emancipation. Tilly and Scott have emphasised the continuity in the status of women, finding three stages in English history. In the pre-industrial era, production was mostly for home use, and women produced much of the needs of the households. The second stage was the "family wage economy" of early industrialisation; the entire family depended on the collective wages of its members, including husband, wife, and older children. The third, or modern, stage is the "family consumer economy", in which the family is the site of consumption, and women are employed in large numbers in retail and clerical jobs to support rising consumption.

Ideas of thrift and hard work characterised middle-class families as the Industrial Revolution swept Europe. These values were displayed in Samuel Smiles' book Self-Help, in which he states that the misery of the poorer classes was "voluntary and self-imposed—the results of idleness, thriftlessness, intemperance, and misconduct."

=== Labour conditions ===
==== Social structure and working conditions ====
Harsh working conditions were prevalent long before the Industrial Revolution. Pre-industrial society was very static and often cruel—child labour, dirty living conditions, and long working hours were just as prevalent before the Industrial Revolution.

The Industrial Revolution witnessed the triumph of a middle class of industrialists and businessmen over a landed class of nobility and gentry. Working people found increased opportunities for employment in mills and factories, but these were under strict working conditions with long hours dominated by a pace set by machines. As late as 1900, most US industrial workers worked 10-hour days, yet earned 20–40% less than that necessary for a decent life. Most workers in textiles, which was the leading industry in terms of employment, were women and children. For workers, industrial life "was a stony desert, which they had to make habitable by their own efforts."

==== Factories and urbanisation ====
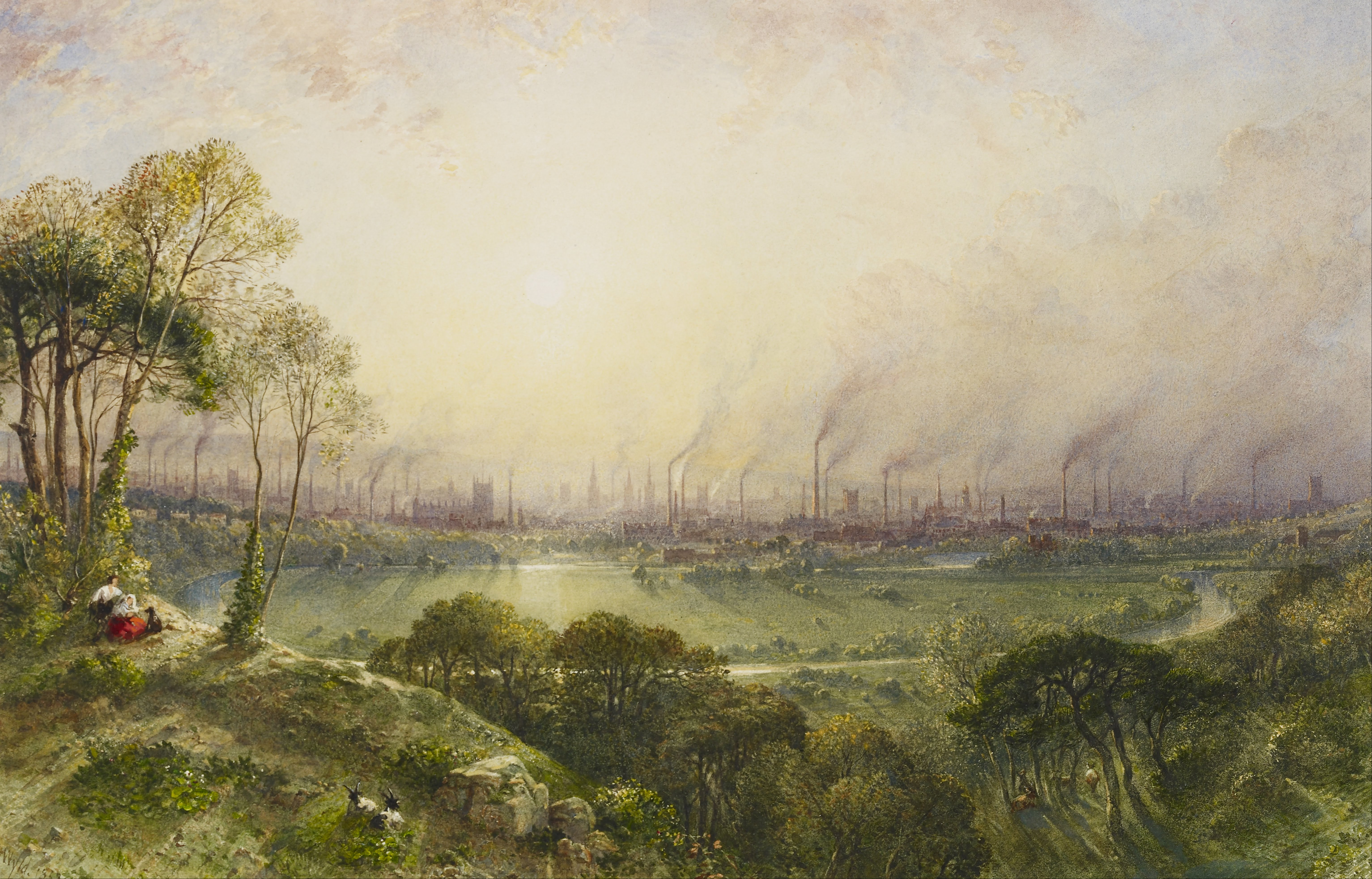
Cottonopolis, an 1852 view of Manchester's factory chimneys by William Wyld, commissioned by Queen Victoria

Industrialisation led to the creation of the factory. The factory system contributed to the growth of urban areas as workers migrated into the cities in search of work in the factories. This was clearly illustrated in the mills and associated industries of Manchester, nicknamed "Cottonopolis", and the world's first industrial city. Manchester experienced a six-times increase in population between 1771 and 1831. Bradford grew by 50% every ten years between 1811 and 1851, and by 1851 only 50% of its population were born there.

For much of the 19th century, production was done in small mills which were typically water-powered and built to serve local needs. Later, each factory would have its own steam engine and a chimney to give an efficient draft through its boiler. Some industrialists tried to improve factory and living conditions for their workers. One early reformer was Robert Owen, known for his pioneering efforts in improving conditions for at the New Lanark mills and often regarded as a key thinker of the early socialist movement.

By 1746 an integrated brass mill was working at Warmley near Bristol. Raw material was smelted into brass and turned into pans, pins, wire, and other goods. Housing was provided for workers on site. Josiah Wedgwood and Matthew Boulton were other prominent early industrialists who employed the factory system.

==== Child labour ====
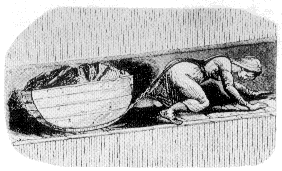
A young "drawer" pulling a coal tub along a mine gallery. In Britain, laws passed in 1842 and 1844 improved mine working conditions.

The chances of surviving childhood did not improve throughout the Industrial Revolution, although infant mortality rates were reduced markedly. There was still limited opportunity for education, and children were expected to work. Child labour had existed before, but with the increase in population and education it became more visible. Many children were forced to work in bad conditions for much lower pay than their elders, 10–20% of an adult male's wage, even though their productivity was comparable; there was no need for strength to operate an industrial machine, and since the industrial system was new, there were no experienced adult labourers. This made child labour the labour of choice for manufacturing in the early phases of the Industrial Revolution, between the 18th and 19th centuries. In England and Scotland in 1788, two-thirds of the workers in 143 water-powered cotton mills were children.

Reports detailing some of the abuses, particularly in the mines and textile factories, helped to popularise the children's plight. The outcry, especially among the upper and middle classes, helped stir change for the young workers' welfare. Politicians and the government tried to limit child labour by law, but factory owners resisted; some felt they were aiding the poor by giving their children money to buy food, others simply welcomed the cheap labour. In 1833 and 1844, the first general laws against child labour, the Factory Acts, were passed in Britain: children younger than nine were not allowed to work, children were not permitted to work at night, and the working day for those under 18 was limited to 12 hours. Factory inspectors enforced the law; however, their scarcity made this difficult. A decade later, the employment of children and women in mining was forbidden. Although laws decreased child labourers, it remained significantly present in Europe and the US until the 20th century.

==== Organisation of labour ====
The Industrial Revolution concentrated labour into mills, factories, and mines, thus facilitating the organisation of combinations or trade unions advance the interests of working people. A union could demand better terms by withdrawing and halting production. Employers had to decide between giving in at a cost, or suffering the cost of the lost production. Skilled workers were difficult to replace, and these were the first to successfully advance their conditions through this kind of bargaining.

The main method unions used, and still use, to effect change was strike action. Many strikes were painful events for both unions and management. In Britain, the Combination Act 1799 forbade workers to form any kind of trade union until its repeal in 1824. Even after this, unions were severely restricted. A British newspaper in 1834 described unions as "the most dangerous institutions that were ever permitted to take root, under shelter of law, in any country..."

The Reform Act 1832 extended the vote in Britain, but did not grant universal suffrage. Six men from Tolpuddle in Dorset founded the Friendly Society of Agricultural Labourers to protest against the lowering of wages in the 1830s. They refused to work for less than ten shillings per week, by this time wages had been reduced to seven shillings and were to be reduced to six. In 1834 James Frampton, a local landowner, wrote to Prime Minister Lord Melbourne to complain about the union, invoking an obscure law from 1797 prohibiting people from swearing oaths to each other, which the members of the Society had done. Six men were arrested, found guilty, and transported to Australia. They became known as the Tolpuddle Martyrs. In the 1830s and 40s, the chartist movement was the first large-scale organised working-class political movement that campaigned for political equality and social justice. Its Charter of reforms received three million signatures, but was rejected by Parliament without consideration.

Working people formed friendly societies and cooperative societies as mutual support groups against times of economic hardship. Enlightened industrialists, such as Robert Owen supported these organisations to improve conditions. Unions slowly overcame the legal restrictions on the right to strike. In 1842, a general strike involving cotton workers and colliers was organised through the chartist movement which stopped production across Britain. Eventually, effective political organisation for working people was achieved through trades unions who, after the extensions of the franchise in 1867 and 1885, began to support socialist parties that merged to become the British Labour Party.

==== Luddites ====
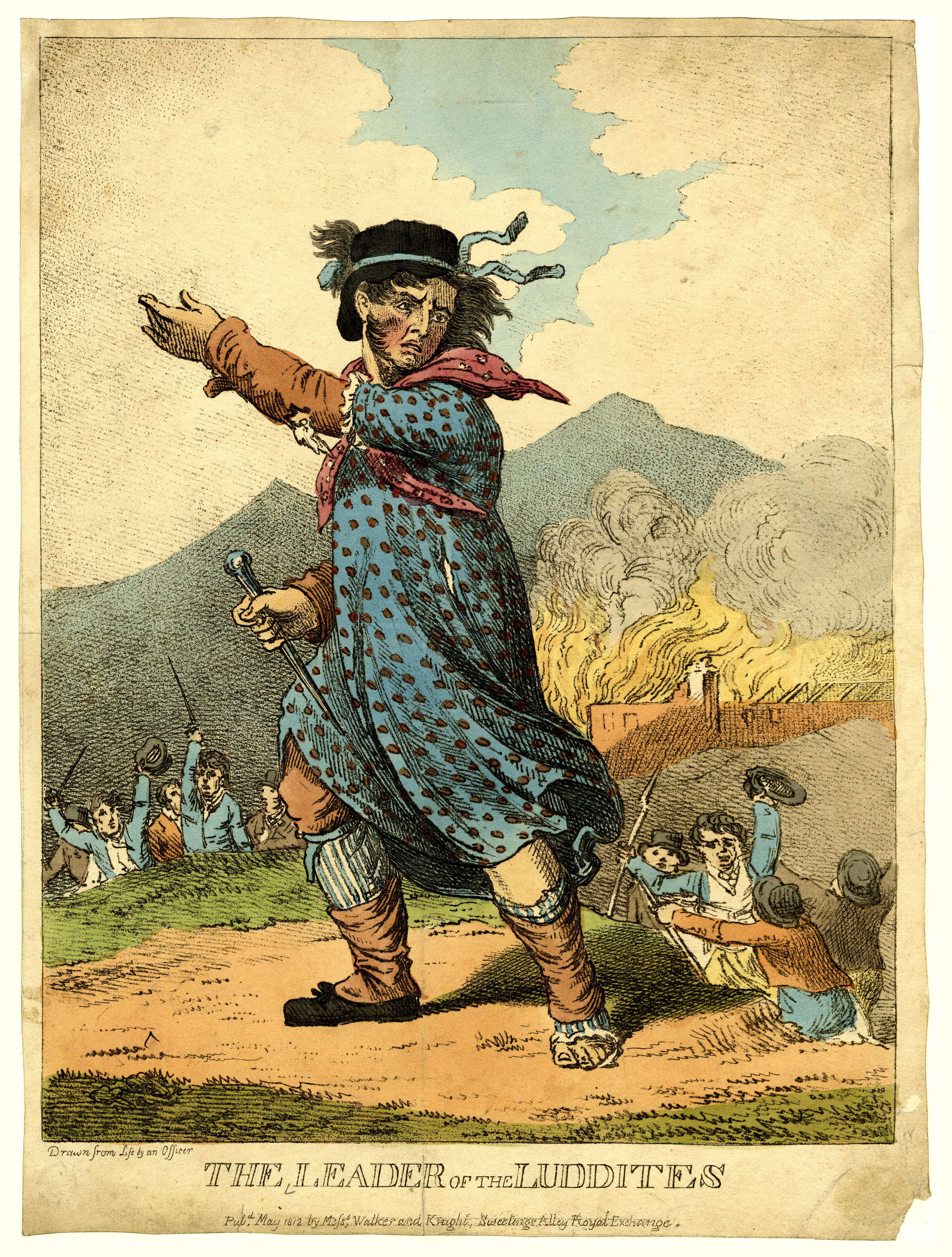
Engraving of Ned Ludd, Leader of the Luddites, 1812

The rapid industrialisation of the English economy cost many craft workers their jobs. The Luddite movement started first with lace and hosiery workers near Nottingham, and spread to other areas of the textile industry. Many weavers found themselves suddenly unemployed as they could no longer compete with machines which required less skilled labour to produce more cloth than one weaver. Many unemployed workers and others turned their animosity towards the machines that had taken their jobs and began destroying factories and machinery. These attackers became known as Luddites, supposedly followers of Ned Ludd, a folklore figure. The first attacks of the movement began in 1811. The Luddites rapidly gained popularity, and the Government took drastic measures using the militia or army to protect industry. Rioters who were caught were tried and hanged, or transported for life.

Unrest continued in other sectors as they industrialised, such as with agricultural labourers in the 1830s when large parts of southern Britain were affected by the Captain Swing disturbances. Threshing machines were a particular target, and hayrick burning was a popular activity. The riots led to the first formation of trade unions and further pressure for reform.

==== Shift in production's centre of gravity ====
The traditional centres of hand textile production such as India, the Middle East, and China could not withstand competition from machine-made textiles, which destroyed the hand-made textile industries and left millions without work, many of whom starved. The Industrial Revolution generated an enormous and unprecedented economic division in the world, as measured by the share of manufacturing output.

Share of total world manufacturing output (percentage)
	1750	1800	1860	1880	1900
Europe	23.2	28.1	53.2	61.3	62.0
United States	0.1	0.8	7.2	14.7	23.6
Japan	3.8	3.5	2.6	2.4	2.4
Rest of the world	73.0	67.7	36.6	20.9	11.0

==== Cotton and the expansion of slavery ====
Cheap cotton textiles increased demand for raw cotton; previously, it had primarily been consumed in subtropical regions where it was grown, with little raw cotton available for export. Consequently, prices of raw cotton rose. British production grew from 2 million pounds in 1700 to 5 million in 1781 to 56 million in 1800. The invention of the cotton gin by American Eli Whitney in 1792 was the decisive event. It allowed green-seeded cotton to become profitable, leading to the widespread growth of slave plantations in the US, Brazil, and the West Indies. In 1791, American cotton production was 2 million pounds, soaring to 35 million by 1800, half of which was exported. America's cotton plantations were highly efficient, profitable and able to keep up with demand. The U.S. Civil War created a "cotton famine" that led to increased production in other areas of the world, including European colonies in Africa.

=== Effect on environment ===
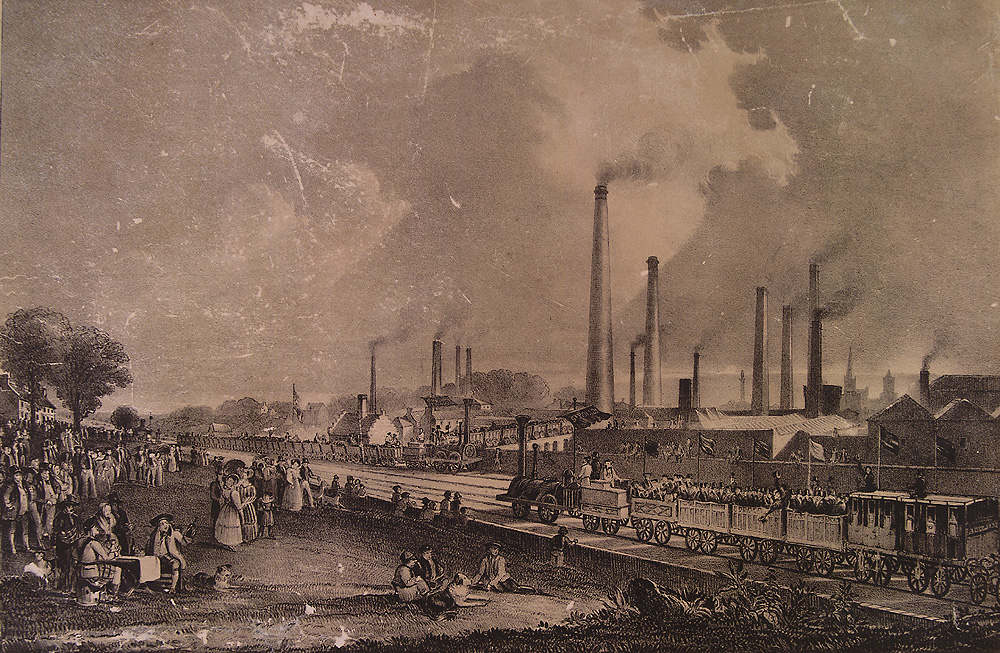
Levels of air pollution rose during the Industrial Revolution, sparking the first modern environmental laws to be passed in the mid-19th century.

The origins of the environmental movement lay in the response to increasing levels of smoke pollution during the Industrial Revolution. The emergence of great factories and the linked immense growth in coal consumption gave rise to an unprecedented level of air pollution in industrial centres; after 1900 the large volume of industrial chemical discharges added to the growing load of untreated human waste. The first large-scale, modern environmental laws came in the form of Britain's Alkali Act 1863, to regulate the air pollution given off by the Leblanc process used to produce soda ash. Alkali inspectors were appointed to curb this pollution.

The manufactured gas industry began in British cities in 1812–20. This produced highly toxic effluent dumped into sewers and rivers. The gas companies were repeatedly sued in nuisance lawsuits. They usually lost and modified the worst practices. The City of London indicted gas companies in the 1820s for polluting the Thames, poisoning its fish. Parliament wrote company charters to regulate toxicity. The industry reached the U.S. around 1850 causing pollution and lawsuits.

In industrial cities local experts and reformers, especially after 1890, took the lead in identifying environmental degradation and pollution, and initiating grass-roots movements to achieve reforms. Typically the highest priority went to water and air pollution. The Coal Smoke Abatement Society was formed in Britain in 1898. It was founded by artist William Blake Richmond, frustrated with the pall cast by coal smoke. Although there were earlier pieces of legislation, the Public Health Act 1875 required all furnaces and fireplaces to consume their smoke. It provided for sanctions against factories that emitted large amounts of black smoke.

== Beyond Great Britain ==
=== Europe ===
The Industrial Revolution in continental Europe started in Belgium and France, then spread to German states by the middle of the 19th century. In many industries, this involved the application of technology developed in Britain. Typically, the technology was purchased from Britain, or British engineers and entrepreneurs moved abroad in search of opportunities. By 1809, part of the Ruhr in Westphalia was called 'Miniature England' because of its similarities. Most European governments provided state funding to the new industries. In some cases, such as iron, the different availability of resources locally meant only some aspects of the British technology were adopted.

==== Belgium ====
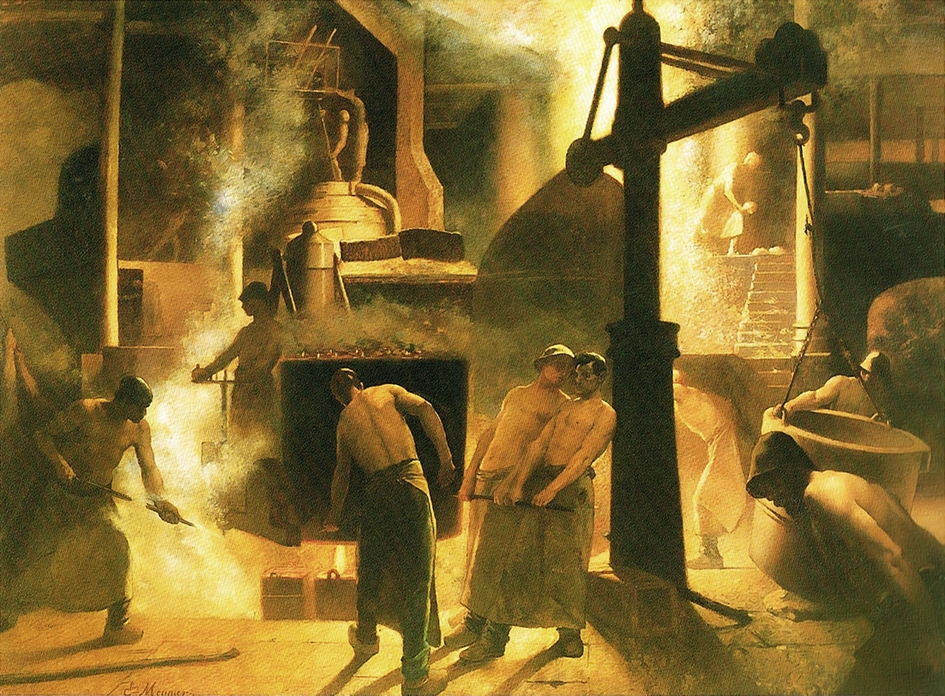
Painting of steel production in Ougrée, Belgium, by Constantin Meunier (1885)

Belgium was the second country in which the Industrial Revolution took place. Thanks to coal, Wallonia in south Belgium, took the lead. Starting in the 1820s, and especially after Belgium became independent in 1830, factories comprising coke blast furnaces as well as puddling and rolling mills were built in the coal mining areas around Liège and Charleroi. The leader was John Cockerill, a transplanted Englishman. His factories at Seraing integrated all stages of production, from engineering to the supply of raw materials, as early as 1825.

Wallonia exemplified the radical evolution of industrial expansion, it was also the birthplace of a strong socialist party and trade unions. With its Sillon industriel, "Especially in the Haine, Sambre and Meuse valleys...there was a huge industrial development based on coal-mining and iron-making...". Philippe Raxhon wrote about the period after 1830: "It was not propaganda but a reality the Walloon regions were becoming the second industrial power...after Britain." "The sole industrial centre outside the collieries and blast furnaces of Walloon was the old cloth-making town of Ghent." Many 19th-century coal mines in Wallonia are now protected as World Heritage Sites. Though Belgium was the second industrial country after Britain, the effect of the Industrial Revolution was different. In 'Breaking stereotypes', Muriel Neven and Isabelle Devious say:

The Industrial Revolution changed a mainly rural society into an urban one, but with a strong contrast between northern and southern Belgium. During the Middle Ages and the early modern period, Flanders was characterised by the presence of large urban centres...at the beginning of the nineteenth century...Flanders...with an urbanisation degree of more than 30 percent, remained one of the most urbanised in the world. By comparison, this proportion reached only 17 percent in Wallonia, barely 10 percent in most West European countries, 16 percent in France, and 25 percent in Britain. 19th-century industrialisation did not affect the traditional urban infrastructure, except in Ghent... Also, in Wallonia, the traditional urban network was largely unaffected by the industrialisation process, even though the proportion of city-dwellers rose from 17 to 45 percent between 1831 and 1910. Especially in the Haine, Sambre and Meuse valleys...where there was a huge industrial development based on coal-mining and iron-making, urbanisation was fast....Nevertheless, industrialisation remained quite traditional in the sense that it did not lead to the growth of modern and large urban centres, but to a conurbation of industrial villages and towns developed around a coal mine or a factory. Communication routes between these small centres only became populated later and created a much less dense urban morphology...

==== France ====
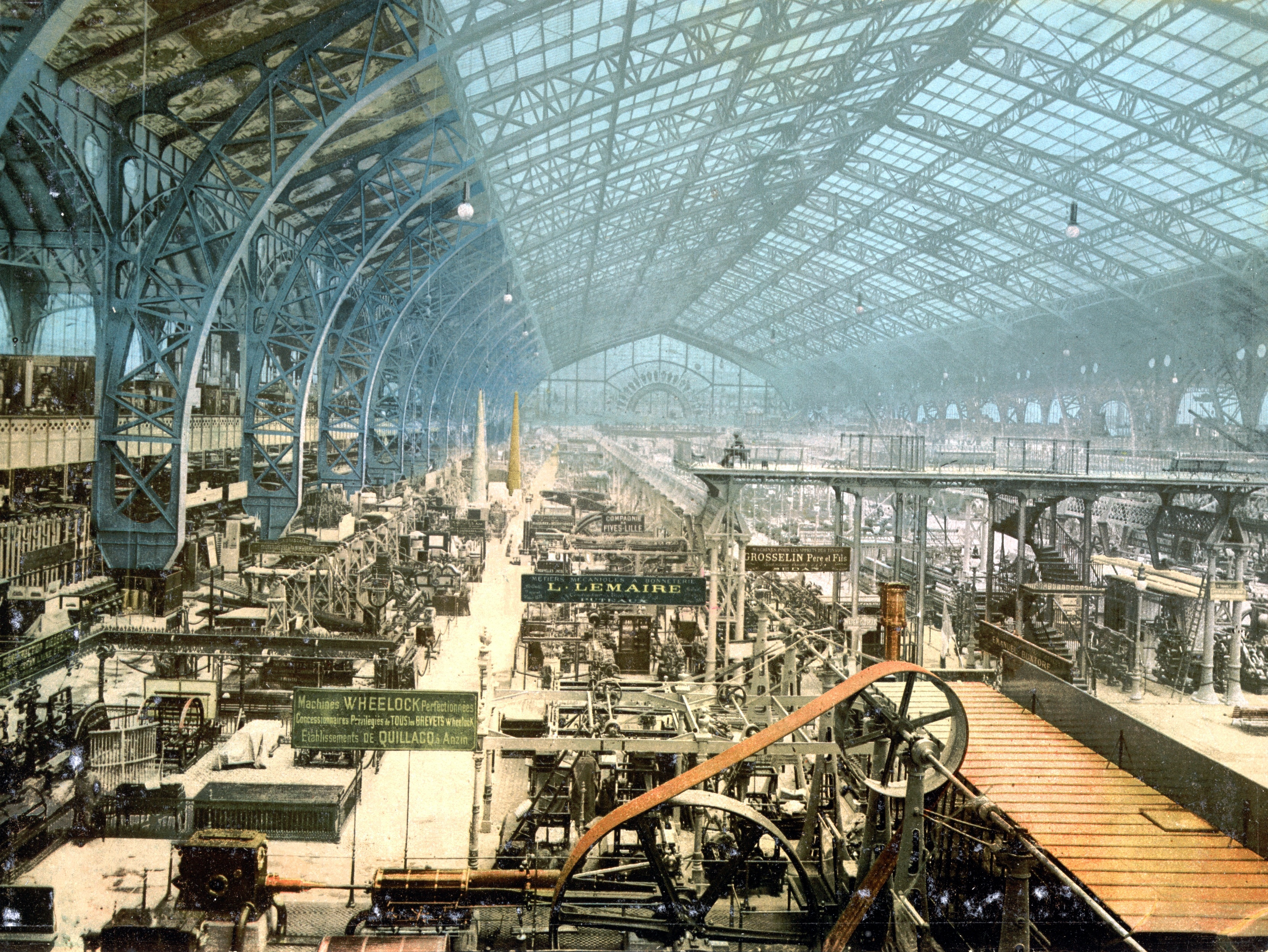
Interior view of the Gallery of Machines at the 1889 Paris Exposition

The Industrial Revolution in France did not correspond to the main model followed by other countries. Most French historians argue France did not go through a clear take-off. Instead, economic growth and industrialisation was slow and steady through the 18th and 19th centuries. However, some stages were identified by Maurice Lévy-Leboyer:

- French Revolution and Napoleonic Wars (1789–1815)
- industrialisation, along with Britain (1815–1860)
- economic slowdown (1860–1905)
- renewal of growth after 1905

==== Germany ====
Germany's political disunity—with three dozen states—and a pervasive conservatism made it difficult to build railways in the 1830s. However, by the 1840s, trunk lines linked the major cities; each German state was responsible for the lines within its borders. Lacking a technological base at first, the Germans imported their engineering and hardware from Britain, but quickly learned the skills needed to operate and expand the railways. In many cities, the new railway shops were the centres of technological awareness and training, so that by 1850, Germany was self-sufficient in meeting the demands of railway construction, and the railways were a major impetus for the growth of the new steel industry. Observers found that even as late as 1890, their engineering was inferior to Britain's. However, German unification in 1871 stimulated consolidation, nationalisation into state-owned companies, and further rapid growth. Unlike in France, the goal was the support of industrialisation, and so heavy lines crisscrossed the Ruhr and other industrial districts and provided good connections to the major ports of Hamburg and Bremen. By 1880, Germany had 9,400 locomotives pulling 43,000 passengers and 30,000 tons of freight, and pulled ahead of France.

Based on its leadership in chemical research in universities and industrial laboratories, Germany became dominant in the world's chemical industry in the late 19th century.

==== Sweden ====
Between 1790 and 1815, Sweden experienced parallel economic movements: an agricultural revolution with larger agricultural estates, new crops, and farming tools and commercialisation of farming, and a proto industrialisation, with small industries established in the countryside and workers switching between agricultural work in the summer and industrial production in the winter. This led to economic growth benefiting the population and leading to a consumption revolution in the 1820s. Between 1815-50, the protoindustries developed into specialised and larger industries. This period witnessed regional specialisation with mining in Bergslagen, textile mills in Sjuhäradsbygden, and forestry in Norrland. Important institutional changes took place, such as the introduction of free and mandatory schooling in 1842 (first time in the world), abolition of the monopoly on trade in handicrafts in 1846, and a stock company law in 1848.

From 1850 to 1890, there was a rapid expansion in exports, dominated by crops, wood, and steel. Sweden abolished most tariffs and other barriers to free trade in the 1850s and joined the gold standard in 1873. Large infrastructural investments were made, mainly in the expanding railroad network, which was financed by the government and private enterprises. From 1890 to 1930, new industries developed with their focus on the domestic market: mechanical engineering, power utilities, papermaking and textiles.

==== Austria-Hungary ====
The Habsburg realms which became Austria-Hungary in 1867 included 23 million inhabitants in 1800, growing to 36 million by 1870. Industrial growth averaged 3% between 1818 and 1870, however, there were strong regional differences. The railway system was built between 1850 and 1873. Before it arrived transportation was slow and expensive. In the Alpine and Bohemian (modern-day Czech Republic) regions, proto-industrialisation began by 1750 and became the center of the Industrial Revolution after 1800. The textile industry was the leader, utilising mechanisation, steam engines, and the factory system. In the Czech lands, the "first mechanical loom followed in Varnsdorf in 1801", with the first steam engines appearing in Bohemia and Moravia a few years later. Textile production flourished particularly in Prague and Brno, the 'Moravian Manchester'. The Czech lands became the centre of industrialisation due to its natural and human resources. The iron industry had developed in the Alpine regions after 1750. Hungary was heavily rural with little industry before 1870. In 1791, Prague organised the first World's Fair; the first industrial exhibition was on the occasion of the coronation of Leopold II as King of Bohemia, which took place in Clementinum, and celebrated the sophistication of manufacturing methods in the Czech lands.

Technological change accelerated industrialisation and urbanisation. GNP per capita grew roughly 1.8% per year from 1870 to 1913. That level of growth compared favourably to that of other European nations such as Britain (1%), France (1.1%), and Germany (1.5%). However, in a comparison with Germany and Britain: the Austro-Hungarian economy as a whole still lagged, as modernisation had begun much later.

=== Japan ===
The Industrial Revolution began about 1870 as Meiji period leaders decided to catch up with the West. The government built railways, improved roads, and inaugurated a land reform program to prepare the country for further development. It inaugurated a new Western-based education system for young people, sent thousands of students to the US and Europe, and hired more than 3,000 Westerners to teach modern science, mathematics, technology, and foreign languages.

In 1871, a group of Japanese politicians known as the Iwakura Mission toured Europe and the US to learn Western ways. The result was a deliberate state-led industrialisation policy to enable Japan to quickly catch up. The Bank of Japan, founded in 1882, used taxes to fund model steel and textile factories. Modern industry first appeared in textiles, including cotton and especially silk, which was based in home workshops in rural areas.

=== United States ===
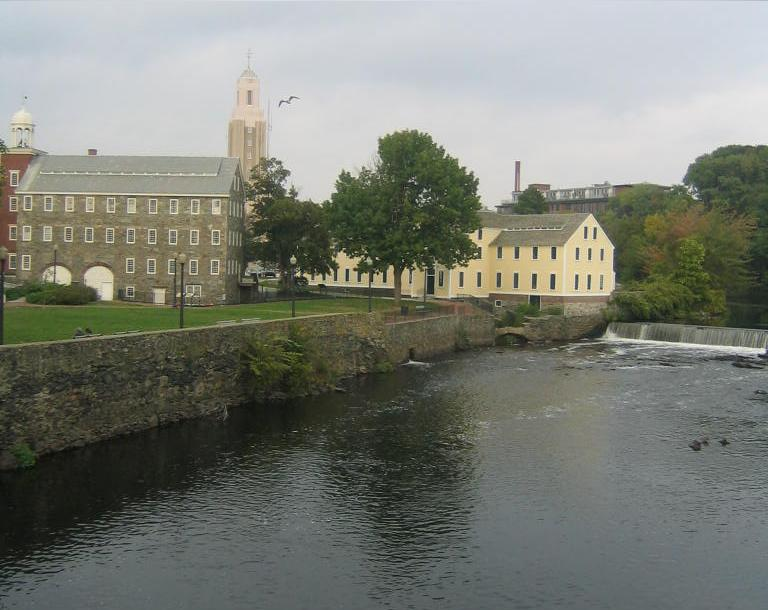
Slater's Mill in Pawtucket, Rhode Island

During the late 18th and early 19th centuries when Western Europe began to industrialise, the US was primarily an agricultural and natural resource producing and processing economy. The building of roads and canals, the introduction of steamboats and the building of railroads were important for handling agricultural and natural resource products in the large and sparsely populated country.

Important American technological contributions were the cotton gin and the development of a system for making interchangeable parts, which was aided by the development of the milling machine in the US. The development of machine tools and system of interchangeable parts was the basis for the rise of the US as the world's leading industrial nation in the late 19th century.

Oliver Evans invented an automated flour mill in the mid-1780s, that used control mechanisms and conveyors so no labour was needed from when grain was loaded into the elevator buckets, until the flour was discharged into a wagon. This is considered to be the first modern materials handling system, an important advance in the progress toward mass production.

The US originally used horse-powered machinery for small-scale applications such as grain milling, but eventually switched to water power after textile factories began being built in the 1790s. As a result, industrialisation was concentrated in New England and the Northeastern United States, which has fast-moving rivers. The newer water-powered production lines proved more economical than horse-drawn production. In the late 19th century steam-powered manufacturing overtook water-powered manufacturing, allowing the industry to spread to the Midwest.

Thomas Somers and the Cabot Brothers founded the Beverly Cotton Manufactory in 1787, the first cotton mill in America, the largest cotton mill of its era, and a significant milestone in the research and development of cotton mills. This mill was designed to use horsepower, but the operators quickly learned that the horse-drawn platform was economically unstable, and had losses for years. Despite this, the Manufactory served as a playground of innovation, both in turning a large amount of cotton, but also developing the water-powered milling structure used in Slater's Mill.

In 1793, Samuel Slater (1768–1835) founded the Slater Mill at Pawtucket, Rhode Island. He had learned of the new textile technologies as a boy apprentice in Derbyshire, England, and defied laws against the emigration of skilled workers by leaving for New York in 1789, hoping to make money with his knowledge. After founding Slater's Mill, he went on to own 13 textile mills. Daniel Day established a wool carding mill in the Blackstone Valley at Uxbridge, Massachusetts in 1809, the third woollen mill established in the US. The Blackstone Valley National Heritage Corridor retraces the history of "America's Hardest-Working River', Blackstone River, which, with its tributaries, cover more than 70 kilometres (45 mi). At its peak over 1,100 mills operated in this valley, including Slater's Mill.

Merchant Francis Cabot Lowell from Newburyport, Massachusetts, memorised the design of textile machines on his tour of British factories in 1810. The War of 1812 ruined his import business but realising demand for domestic-finished cloth was emerging in America, on his return he set up the Boston Manufacturing Company. Lowell and his partners built America's second cotton-to-cloth textile mill at Waltham, Massachusetts, second to the Beverly Cotton Manufactory. After his death in 1817, his associates built America's first planned factory town, which they named after him. This enterprise was capitalised in a public stock offering, one of the first uses of it in the US. Lowell, Massachusetts, using nine kilometres (5 1/2 miles) of canals and 7,500 kilowatts (10,000 horsepower) delivered by the Merrimack River. The short-lived utopia-like Waltham-Lowell system was formed, as a direct response to the poor working conditions in Britain. However, by 1850, especially following the Great Famine of Ireland, the system had been replaced by poor immigrant labour.

A major U.S. contribution to industrialisation was the development of techniques to make interchangeable parts from metal. Precision metal machining techniques were developed by the U.S. Department of War to make interchangeable parts for firearms. Techniques included using fixtures to hold the parts in the proper position, jigs to guide the cutting tools and precision blocks and gauges to measure the accuracy. The milling machine, a fundamental machine tool, is believed to have been invented by Eli Whitney, who was a government contractor who built firearms as part of this program. Another important invention was the Blanchard lathe, invented by Thomas Blanchard. The Blanchard lathe was actually a shaper that could produce copies of wooden gun stocks. The use of machinery and the techniques for producing standardised and interchangeable parts became known as the American system of manufacturing.

Precision manufacturing techniques made it possible to build machines that mechanised the shoe and watch industries. The industrialisation of the watch industry started in 1854 also in Waltham, Massachusetts, at the Waltham Watch Company, with the development of machine tools, gauges and assembling methods adapted to the micro precision required for watches.

== Causes ==
Regional GDP per capita changed very little for most of human history before the Industrial Revolution.

The causes of the Industrial Revolution were complicated and remain debated. Geographic factors include Britain's vast mineral resources. In addition to metal ores, Britain had the highest quality coal reserves known at the time, as well as abundant water power, highly productive agriculture, numerous seaports and navigable waterways.

Some historians believe the Industrial Revolution was an outgrowth of social and institutional changes brought by the end of feudalism in Britain after the English Civil War in the 17th century, although feudalism began to break down after the Black Death of the mid 14th century. The Enclosure movement and the British Agricultural Revolution made food production more efficient and less labour-intensive, forcing farmers no longer self-sufficient into cottage industry, for example weaving, and in the longer term into the cities and newly developed factories. The colonial expansion of the 17th century with the accompanying development of international trade, creation of financial markets and accumulation of capital are cited as factors, as is the Scientific Revolution of the 17th century. A change to getting married later made people able to accumulate more human capital during their youth, thereby encouraging economic development.

Until the 1980s, it was believed technological innovation was the heart of the Industrial Revolution and the key enabling technology was the invention of the steam engine. Lewis Mumford has proposed that the Industrial Revolution had its origins in the Early Middle Ages, earlier than most estimates. He explains that the model for standardised mass production was the printing press and that "the archetypal model for the industrial era was the clock". He cites the monastic emphasis on order and time-keeping, and the fact medieval cities had at their centre a church with bell ringing at regular intervals, as necessary precursors to a synchronisation necessary for later manifestations such as the steam engine. Anthropologist Joseph Henrich also argues for an origin in the Early Middle Ages but specifically identifies the primary cause as the dissolution of European kinship networks under pressure from the Catholic Church.

The presence of a large domestic market is considered an important driver of the Industrial Revolution, particularly explaining why it occurred in Britain. In other nations, such as France, markets were split up by local regions, which often imposed tolls and tariffs on goods traded among them. Internal tariffs were abolished by Henry VIII of England, they survived in Russia until 1753, 1789 in France and 1839 in Spain.

Governments' grant of limited monopolies to inventors under a developing patent system is considered an influential factor. The effects of patents, on the development of industrialisation are clearly illustrated in the history of the steam engine. In return for publicly revealing the workings of an invention, patents rewarded inventors such as James Watt by allowing them to monopolise production, and increasing the pace of technological development. However, monopolies bring inefficiencies which counterbalance, or even overbalance, the benefits of publicising ingenuity and rewarding inventors. Watt's monopoly prevented other inventors from introducing improved steam engines, thereby slowing the spread of steam power.

=== Causes in Europe ===
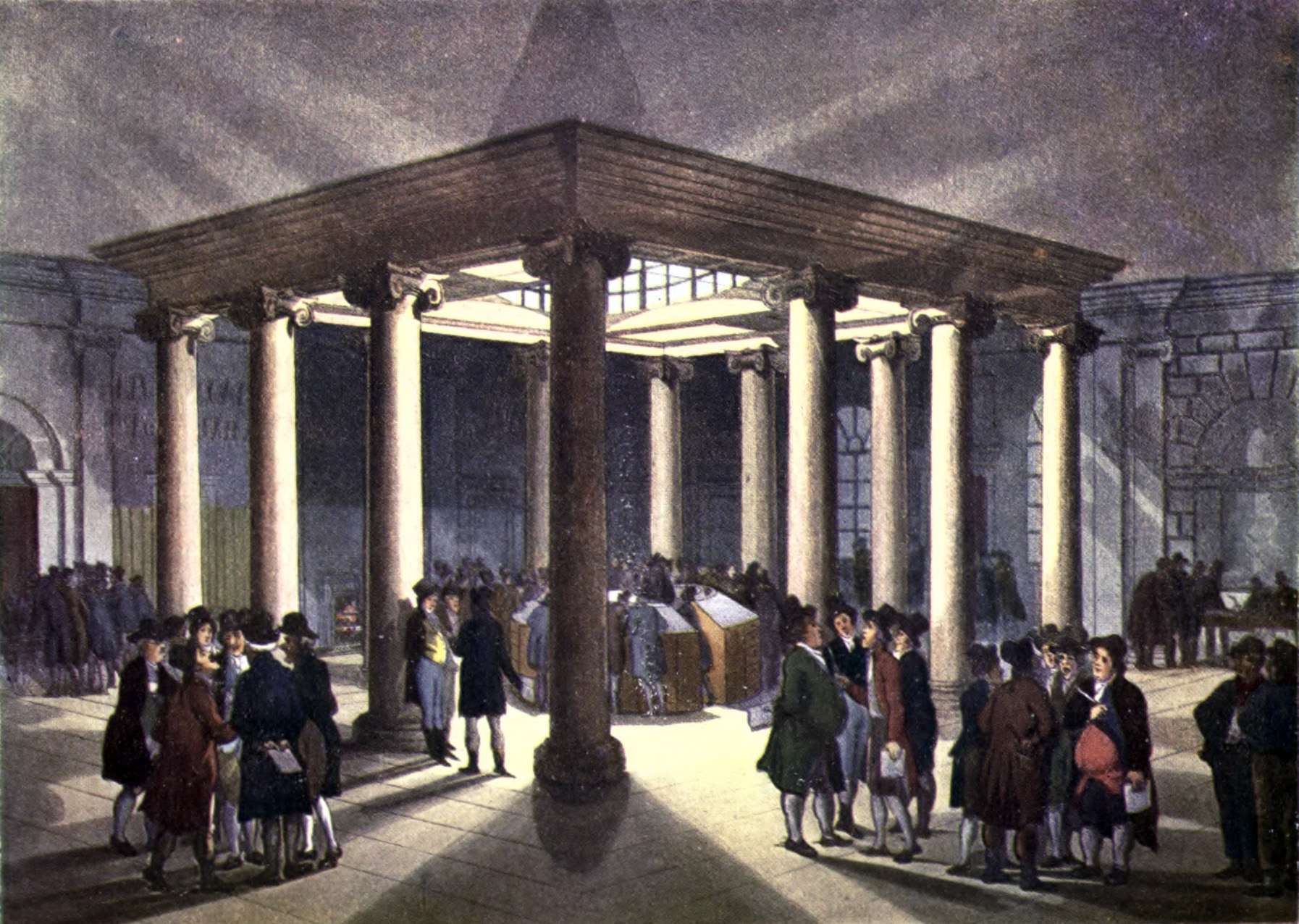
Interior of the London Coal Exchange, c. 1808. European 17th-century colonial expansion, international trade, and creation of financial markets produced a new legal and financial environment, one which supported and enabled 18th-century industrial growth.

A question of active interest is why the Industrial Revolution occurred in Europe and not elsewhere, particularly China, India, and the Middle East (which pioneered in shipbuilding, textiles and water mills between 750-1100), or at other times like in Classical Antiquity or the Middle Ages. One account argues Europeans have been characterized for millennia by a freedom-loving culture originating from the aristocratic societies of Indo-European invaders. Many historians, however, have challenged this as being not only Eurocentric, but ignoring historical context. In fact, before the Industrial Revolution, "there existed something of a global economic parity between the most advanced regions in the world economy." These historians have suggested other factors, including education, technological changes, "modern" government, "modern" work attitudes, ecology, and culture.

China was the most technologically advanced country for centuries; however, it stagnated and was surpassed by Europe before the Age of Discovery, by which time China banned imports and denied entry to foreigners. It taxed transported goods heavily. Modern estimates of per capita income in Western Europe in the late 18th century are roughly 1,500 dollars in purchasing power parity whereas China had only 450 dollars. India was feudal, politically fragmented and not as advanced as Western Europe.

Historians such as David Landes and sociologists Max Weber and Rodney Stark credit the different belief systems in Asia and Europe with dictating where the revolution occurred. The religion and beliefs of Europe were products of Judeo-Christian and Greek thought. Chinese society was founded on men like Confucius, Mencius, Han Feizi, and Buddha, resulting in different worldviews. Other factors include the considerable distance of China's coal deposits from its cities, as well as the then unnavigable Yellow River that connects deposits to the sea.

Historian Joel Mokyr argued political fragmentation, the presence of many European states, made it possible for heterodox ideas to thrive, as entrepreneurs, innovators, ideologues and heretics could easily move to a neighboring state if one state suppressed their ideas and activities. This is what set Europe apart from the technologically advanced, large unitary empires such as China, by providing "an insurance against economic and technological stagnation". China had a printing press and movable type, and India had similar scientific and technological achievement as Europe in 1700, yet the Industrial Revolution occurred in Europe first. In Europe, political fragmentation was coupled with an "integrated market for ideas" where Europe's intellectuals used the lingua franca of Latin, had a shared intellectual basis in Europe's classical heritage and the pan-European institution of the Republic of Letters. Political institutions could contribute to the relation between democratization and economic growth during the Great Divergence.

Europe's monarchs desperately needed revenue, pushing them into alliances with their merchant classes. Groups of merchants were granted monopolies and tax-collecting responsibilities in exchange for payments to the state. Located in a region "at the hub of the largest and most varied network of exchange in history", Europe advanced as the leader of the Industrial Revolution. In the Americas, Europeans found a windfall of silver, timber, fish, and maize, leading Peter Stearns to conclude that "Europe's industrial revolution, which was to have such dramatic effects on the wider world, stemmed in great part from Europe's changing position in the wider world, and a particular desire to catch up or surpass Asian manufacturing competitors."

Modern capitalism originated in the Italian city-states around the end of the first millennium. The city-states were prosperous cities that were independent from feudal lords. They were republics whose governments were composed of merchants, manufacturers, members of guilds, bankers and financiers. The city-states built a network of branch banks in western European cities and introduced double entry bookkeeping. Italian commerce was supported by schools that taught numeracy in financial calculations through abacus schools.

=== Causes in Britain ===
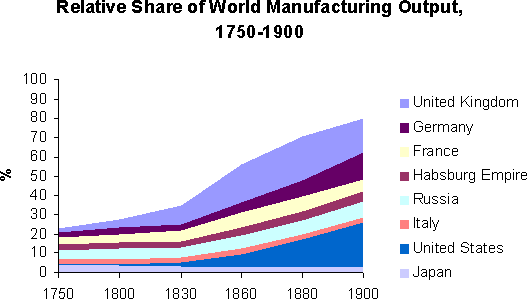
As the Industrial Revolution developed, British manufacturing output surged ahead of other economies

Britain provided the legal and cultural foundations that enabled entrepreneurs to pioneer the Industrial Revolution. Key factors were:

- The period of peace and stability which followed the unification of England and Scotland
- No internal trade barriers, including between England and Scotland, or feudal tolls and tariffs, making Britain the "largest coherent market in Europe"
- The rule of law (enforcing property rights and contracts)
- A straightforward legal system that allowed the formation of joint-stock companies (corporations)
- Geographic and natural resource advantages
  - Extensive coastlines and many navigable rivers in an age where water was the easiest means of transport
  - Britain had the highest quality coal in Europe and many sites for water power.

There were two main values that drove the Industrial Revolution in Britain: self-interest and entrepreneurial spirit. Because of these, many advances were made that resulted in a huge increase in personal wealth and a consumer revolution. These advancements benefitted British society as a whole. Countries recognised the advancements and used them to begin their own revolutions.

A debate sparked by Eric Williams in his work Capitalism and Slavery (1944), concerned the role of slavery in financing the Industrial Revolution. Williams argued European capital amassed from slavery was vital in the early years of the revolution. This led to historiographical debate, with Seymour Drescher critiquing Williams' arguments in Econocide (1977).

The greater liberalisation of trade, from a large merchant base, may have allowed Britain to produce and use emerging scientific and technological developments more effectively than countries with stronger monarchies. Britain emerged from the Napoleonic Wars as the only European nation not ravaged by financial plunder, and with the only significant merchant fleet. (Note: The Royal Navy may have contributed to Britain's industrial growth. Among the first complex industrial manufacturing processes to arise in Britain were those that produced material for warships. The average warship of the period used roughly 1000 pulley fittings. With a fleet as large as the Royal Navy, and with these fittings needing to be replaced every four to five years, this created a great demand which encouraged industrial expansion. The industrial manufacture of rope can also be seen as a similar factor.) Britain's extensive exporting cottage industries ensured markets were already available for early forms of manufactured goods. Most British warfare was conducted overseas, reducing the devastating effects of territorial conquest that affected much of Europe. This was further aided by Britain's geographical position—an island separated from the rest of Europe.

"An unprecedented explosion of new ideas, and new technological inventions, transformed our use of energy, creating an increasingly industrial and urbanised country. Roads, railways and canals were built. Great cities appeared. Scores of factories and mills sprang up. Our landscape would never be the same again. It was a revolution that transformed not only the country, but the world itself."

— British historian Jeremy Black on the BBC's Why the Industrial Revolution Happened Here.

Britain was able to succeed due to the key resources it possessed, and population density. Enclosure of common land and the related agricultural revolution made supply of labour readily available. There was a local coincidence of natural resources in the North of England, the Midlands, South Wales and the Scottish Lowlands. Local supplies of coal, iron, lead, copper, tin, limestone and water power resulted in excellent conditions for the development and expansion of industry. Also, the damp, mild weather conditions of the North West of England provided ideal conditions for the spinning of cotton, providing a natural starting point for the birth of the textiles industry.

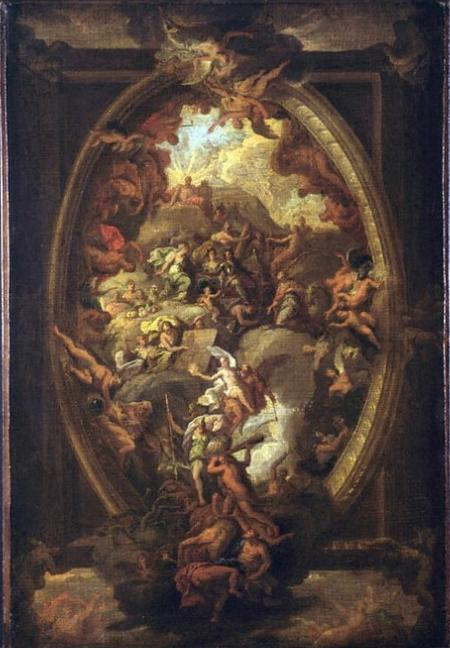
William and Mary Presenting the Cap of Liberty to Europe, a 1710 painting by James Thornhill, depicting William III and Mary II who had taken the throne after the Glorious Revolution and signed the English Bill of Rights of 1689. William tramples on arbitrary power and hands the red cap of liberty to Europe where, unlike Britain, absolute monarchy stayed the normal form of power execution. Below William is the French king Louis XIV.

The stable political situation in Britain from 1688, following the Glorious Revolution, and society's greater receptiveness to change than other European countries, can be said to be factors favouring the Industrial Revolution. Reinforcement of confidence in the rule of law, which followed establishment of the prototype of constitutional monarchy in 1688, and the emergence of a stable financial market based on the management of the national debt by the Bank of England, contributed to the capacity for private financial investment in industrial ventures. Peasant resistance to industrialisation was eliminated by the Enclosure movement, and the landed classes developed commercial interests that made them pioneers in removing obstacles to capitalism. Taking refuge in England in 1726, Voltaire wrote about commerce and religious diversity in Letters on the English (1733), noting why England was more prosperous compared to less religiously tolerant European neighbours:

"Take a view of the Royal Exchange in London, a place more venerable than many courts of justice, where the representatives of all nations meet for the benefit of mankind. There the Jew, the Mahometan [Muslim], and the Christian transact together, as though they all professed the same religion, and give the name of infidel to none but bankrupts. There the Presbyterian confides in the Anabaptist, and the Churchman depends on the Quaker's word. If one religion only were allowed in England, the Government would very possibly become arbitrary; if there were but two, the people would cut one another's throats; but as there are such a multitude, they all live happy and in peace."

Britain's population grew 280% from 1550 to 1820, while the rest of Western Europe grew 50–80%. 70% of European urbanisation happened in Britain from 1750 to 1800. By 1800, only the Netherlands was more urbanised. This was only possible because coal, coke, imported cotton, brick and slate had replaced wood, charcoal, flax, peat and thatch. The latter compete with land grown to feed people while mined materials do not. Yet more land would be freed when chemical fertilisers replaced manure and horse's work was mechanised. A workhorse needs 1.2 to 2.0 ha (3 to 5 acres) for fodder while even early steam engines produced four times more mechanical energy.

In 1700, five-sixths of the coal mined worldwide was in Britain, while the Netherlands had none; so despite having Europe's best transport, lowest taxes, and most urbanised, well-paid, and literate population, it did not industrialise. Without coal, Britain would have run out of suitable river sites for mills by the 1830s. Based on science and experimentation from the continent, the steam engine was developed for pumping water out of mines, many of which in Britain had been mined to below the water table. Although inefficient they were economical because they used unsaleable coal. Iron rails were developed to transport coal, which was a major economic sector in Britain.

Bob Allen has argued that high wages, cheap capital and very cheap energy in Britain made it the ideal place for the industrial revolution. These factors made it vastly more profitable to invest in research and development, and put technology to use than other societies. However, 2018 studies in The Economic History Review showed wages were not particularly high in spinning or construction sectors, casting doubt on Allen's explanation. A 2022 study found industrialization happened in areas with low wages and high mechanical skills, whereas literacy, banks and proximity to coal had little explanatory power.

==== Protestant work ethic ====
Another theory is that the British advance was due to the presence of an entrepreneurial class which believed in progress, technology and hard work. The existence of this class is often linked to the Protestant work ethic and particular status of Baptists and dissenting Protestant sects, such as the Quakers and Presbyterians. English Dissenters were barred or discouraged from almost all public offices, as well as education at England's only two universities. When the restoration of the monarchy took place in 1660 and membership in the official Church of England became mandatory due to the Test Act, they thereupon became active in banking, manufacturing and education. The Unitarians were very involved in education, by running Dissenting Academies, where, in contrast to the universities of Oxford and Cambridge and schools such as Eton and Harrow, much attention was given to mathematics and the sciences, vital to the development of manufacturing technologies.

Historians sometimes consider this social factor to be important. While members of these sects were excluded from certain circles of the government, they were considered fellow Protestants by many in the middle class, such as financiers or other businessmen. Given this tolerance and the supply of capital, the natural outlet for more enterprising members of these sects was in new opportunities in the technologies created in the wake of the scientific revolution of the 17th century.

=== Transfer of knowledge ===
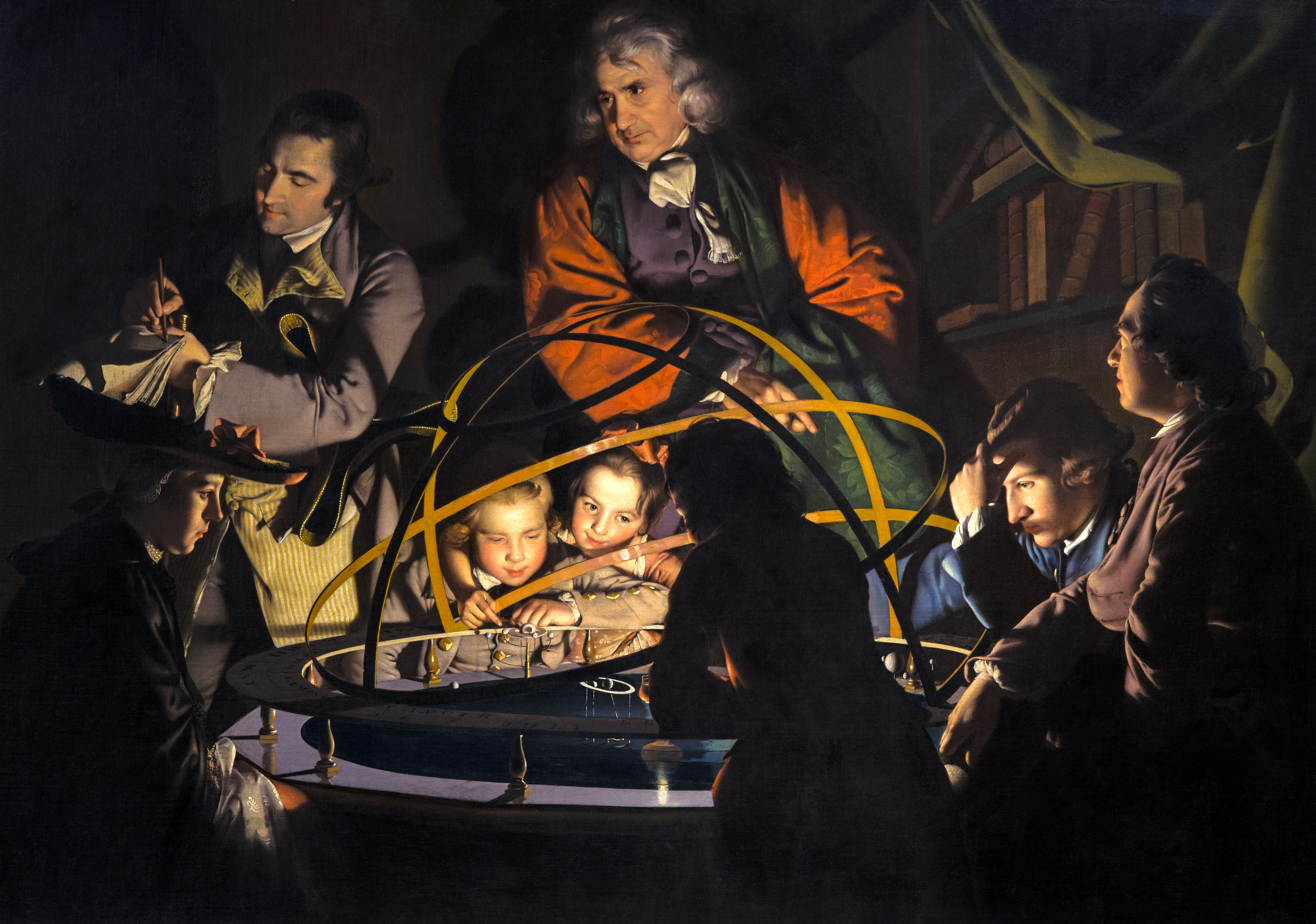
A Philosopher Lecturing on the Orrery a c. 1766 illustration by Joseph Wright of Derby depicting informal philosophical societies spreading scientific advances

Knowledge of innovation was spread by several means. Workers trained in a technique might move to another employer. A common method was the study tour, in which individuals gathered information abroad. Throughout the Industrial Revolution and preceding century, European countries and America engaged in such tours; Sweden and France trained civil servants and technicians to undertake them as policy, while in Britain and America manufacturers pursued tours independently. Tour diaries are invaluable records of methods. Translation of new technological knowledge into local vernacular has been credited with enabling the diffusion of technological knowledge.

Innovation spread via informal networks such as the Lunar Society of Birmingham, whose members met from 1765 to 1809 to discuss natural philosophy and its industrial applications. They have been described as "the revolutionary committee of that most far-reaching of all the eighteenth-century revolutions, the Industrial Revolution." Similar societies published papers and proceedings; the Royal Society of Arts issued annual Transactions and illustrated volumes of inventions.

Technical encyclopaedias disseminated methods. John Harris's Lexicon Technicum (1704) offered extensive scientific and engineering entries. Abraham Rees's The Cyclopaedia; or, Universal Dictionary of Arts, Sciences, and Literature (1802–19) contained detailed articles and engraved plates on machines and processes. French works such as the Descriptions des Arts et Métiers and Diderot's Encyclopédie similarly documented foreign techniques with engraved illustrations. Periodicals on manufacturing and patents emerged in the 1790s; for instance, French journals like the Annales des Mines printed engineers' travel reports on British factories, helping diffuse innovations.

== Philosophical views ==
The industrial revolution has been criticised by some for aiding ecosystem collapse, mental illness, pollution and detrimental social systems. It has also been criticised for valuing profits over life and human comfort. Multiple movements have arisen which reject aspects of the industrial revolution, such as the Amish or primitivists.

=== Humanism and harsh conditions ===
Some humanists and individualists criticise the Industrial Revolution for mistreating women and children and turning men into work machines that lacked autonomy. Critics of the Industrial Revolution promoted a more interventionist state and formed new organisations to promote human rights.

=== Primitivism ===
Primitivism argues that the Industrial Revolution has created an unnatural frame of society and the world in which humans need to adapt to an unnatural urban landscape in which humans are perpetual cogs without personal autonomy.

Certain primitivists argue for a return to pre-industrial society, while others argue that technology such as modern medicine, and agriculture are all positive for humanity assuming they are controlled by and serve humanity and have no effect on the natural environment.

=== Environmental harm ===
The Industrial Revolution has been criticised for leading to immense ecological and habitat destruction. It led to immense decrease in the biodiversity of life on Earth. Angela Mawle alleges the Industrial revolution has been said to be inherently unsustainable and will lead to eventual collapse of society, mass hunger, starvation, and resource scarcity.

=== Opposition from Romanticism ===
During the Industrial Revolution, an intellectual and artistic hostility towards the new industrialisation developed, associated with the Romantic movement. Romanticism revered the traditionalism of rural life and recoiled against the upheavals caused by industrialisation, urbanisation and the wretchedness of the working classes. Its major exponents in English included the artist and poet William Blake and poets William Wordsworth, Samuel Taylor Coleridge, John Keats, Lord Byron and Percy Bysshe Shelley.

The movement stressed the importance of "nature" in art and language, in contrast to "monstrous" machines and factories; the "Dark satanic mills" of Blake's poem "And did those feet in ancient time". Mary Shelley's Frankenstein reflected concerns that scientific progress might be two-edged. French Romanticism likewise was highly critical of industry.

== See also ==
- Industrial Revolution in the United States
- Capitalist mode of production (Marxist theory) – Systems of organizing production and distribution within capitalist societies
- Economic history of the United Kingdom
- Fourth Industrial Revolution – Term for 2010s–present technological era
- History of capitalism
- Industrial Age – Period of human history from the mid 18th to late 20th centuries
- Industrial society – Society driven by the use of technology to enable mass production
- Industrialisation of Africa
- Industrialization of China
- Law of the handicap of a head start – Phenomenon of an initial advantage not lasting (Dialectics of progress)
- Machine Age – Period of early 20th century history of rapid technological advancement
- Textile manufacture during the British Industrial Revolution – Early textile production via automated means (A good description of the early industrial revolution)
- The Protestant Ethic and the Spirit of Capitalism – 1905 sociology book by Max Weber
