= Silk industry in Cheshire =

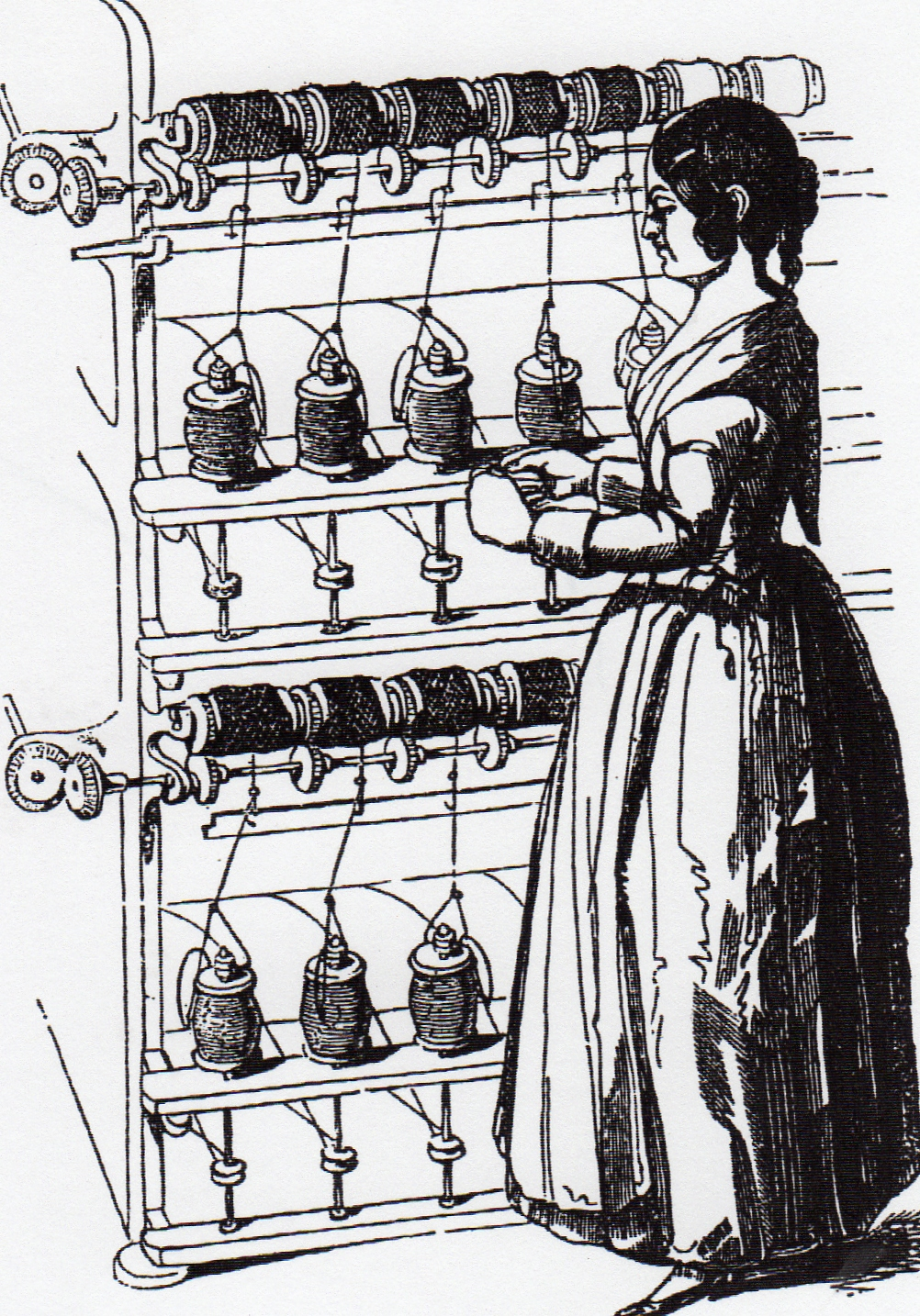
A simple silk-throwing frame where the continuous filament from the top/horizontal bobbin is pulled onto the vertical/bottom bobbin; a flyer round the bottom bobbin inserts a twist

Congleton, Macclesfield, Bollington and Stockport, England, were traditionally silk-weaving towns. Silk was woven in Cheshire from the late 1600s. The handloom weavers worked in the attic workshops in their own homes. Macclesfield was famous for silk buttons manufacture. The supply of silk from Italy was precarious and some hand throwing was done, giving way after 1732 to water-driven mills, which were established in Stockport and Macclesfield.

== Location ==
Cheshire is a county in North West England. To the east of the county the landscape changes dramatically from the alluvial plain of Central Cheshire to the hill country of the Peak District. Fast flowing streams forming the River Dane, River Bollin, River Dean and River Goyt provided a moist environment and potential power to drive waterwheels in mills. The coach road from Derby to Manchester passes through, or near to each of the prominent silk towns, and later in 1831 Macclesfield Canal joined Congleton, Macclesfield and Bollington to the Trent and Mersey Canal and the Midlands and the seaports.

== Silk ==
Silk is a naturally produced fibre obtained from many species of the silk moth. In 1700 the favoured silk was produced by a moth (Bombyx mori), that used it to spin a closed cocoon to protect her larvae. These fed on the mulberry leaf which was grown in Italy. Silk fibres from the Bombyx mori silkworm have a triangular cross section with rounded corners, 5–10 μm wide. The silk is a protein called fibroin, and it was cemented in place by the use of a gum, another protein called sericin. The cocoons were harvested and placed in troughs of hot water that dissolved the gum and allowed the single thread to be wound into a skein.

=== The silk-throwing process ===
The skeins were placed into bales and taken to the mill for processing. Three sorts of yarn were commonly produced: no-twist which was suitable for weft, tram that had received a slight twist making it easier to handle, and organzine which had a greater twist and was suitable for use as warp. Reeling is the process where the silk that has been wound into skeins, is cleaned, receives a twist and is wound onto bobbins. Silk throwing is the process where the filament from the bobbins is given its full twist. The process where filaments or threads from three or more bobbins are wound together is called doubling. The last two processes can occur more than once and in any order. Tram was wound, thrown and doubled, organzine was wound, doubled then thrown and doubled again. Sewing silk could receive further doubling and throwing. No-twist was often three single filaments doubled together. Many other combinations were possible. Colloquially silk throwing can be used to refer to the whole process: reeling, throwing and doubling, and silk throwsters would speak of throwing as twisting or spinning.

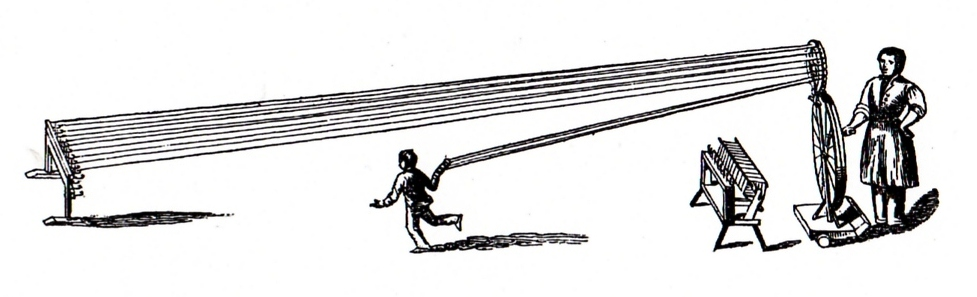
1843 Illustration

Silk throwing was originally a hand process relying on turning a wheel (the gate) that twisted four threads while a helper, who would be a child, ran the length of a shade, hooked the threads on stationary pins (the cross) and ran back to start the process again. The shade would be between 23 and 32 m long. The process was described in detail to Lord Shaftesbury's Royal Commission of Inquiry into the Employment of Children in 1841:

For twisting it is necessary to have what are designated shades which are buildings of at least 30 or 35 yards in length, of two or more rooms, rented separately by one, two or four men having one gate and a boy called a helper... the upper storey is generally occupied by children, young persons or grown women as 'piecers', 'winders' and 'doublers' attending to their reels and bobbins, driven by the exertions of one man... He (the boy) takes first a rod containing four bobbins of silk from the twister who stands at his gate or wheel, and having fastened the ends, runs to the 'cross' at the extreme end of the room, round which he passes the threads of each bobbin and returns to the 'gate'. He is despatched on a second expedition of the same kind, and returns as before, he then runs up to the cross and detaches the threads and comes to the roller. Supposing the master to make twelve rolls a day, the boy necessarily runs fourteen miles, and this is barefooted.

In 1700, the Italians were the most technologically advanced throwsters in Europe and had developed two machines capable of winding the silk onto bobbins while putting a twist in the thread. They called the throwing machine a filatoio and the doubler a torcitoio. There is an illustration of a circular hand-powered throwing machine drawn in 1487 with 32 spindles. The first evidence of an externally powered filatoio comes from the thirteenth century, and the earliest illustration from around 1500. Filatorios and torcitoios contained parallel circular frames that revolved round each other on a central axis. The speed of the relative rotation determined the twist. Silk would only cooperate in the process if the temperature and humidity were high; in Italy the temperature was elevated by sunlight but in Derby the mill had to be heated, and the heat evenly distributed.

In East Cheshire only two mills are known with certainty to have been built to house Italian-style circular throwing machines, the Old Mill at Congleton and the Button Mill, Macclesfield. By 1820, throwing was done using rectangular frames, manufactured from cast iron, and powered by belts from line shafts.

=== Silk spinning ===
Thrown silk is twisted single filament. There is a lot of waste from processing and damaged cocoons. Silk is expensive and ways were found to recover the waste. The waste was cut into fibres 25–50 mm long, and then these were spun like worsted or cotton using a throstle. This was 'short silk'. Such a short thread produced a silk with an inferior lustre. In 1836 Gibson and Campbell patented a 'long silk' machine for spinning staples up to 250 mm. Carding and combing (known as dressing) remained a problem until Lister invented the self-acting dressing machine in 1877. Spun silk is softer than thrown silk and easily blended with other fibres. Silk spinning became an important industry in Congleton: taking place in Stonehouse Green and Brooks Mill, Forge Mill and Bath Vale. Brocklehursts continued long silk spinning in Macclesfield until the 1950s.

=== Silk weaving ===
Early silk looms were similar to woollen looms, built of wood and operated by hand. A man would operate the heddles, and would pass the shuttle though the shed and batten the fell. Naturally the reeds were adapted for the far finer thread. In 1733, John Kay's flying shuttle influenced silk weavers too. Silk ribbons were woven first, and broad-silk looms arrived around 1756.

Silk weavers often worked at home, cottages and later houses were built with loomshops in the roof space. These garret workshops had distinctive large casements. Later, these garrets were built with separate access.

==== Jacquard Looms ====
In about 1821, the Jacquard mechanism began to br attached to looms. By means of punched cards, the Jacquard head allowed patterns of great complexity to be woven. In the twentieth century, Macclesfield Silk Pictures became famous, these were woven on these looms by firms such as the BWA (Brocklehurst Whiston Amalgamated). Today they are collectables.

=== Dyeing and printing ===
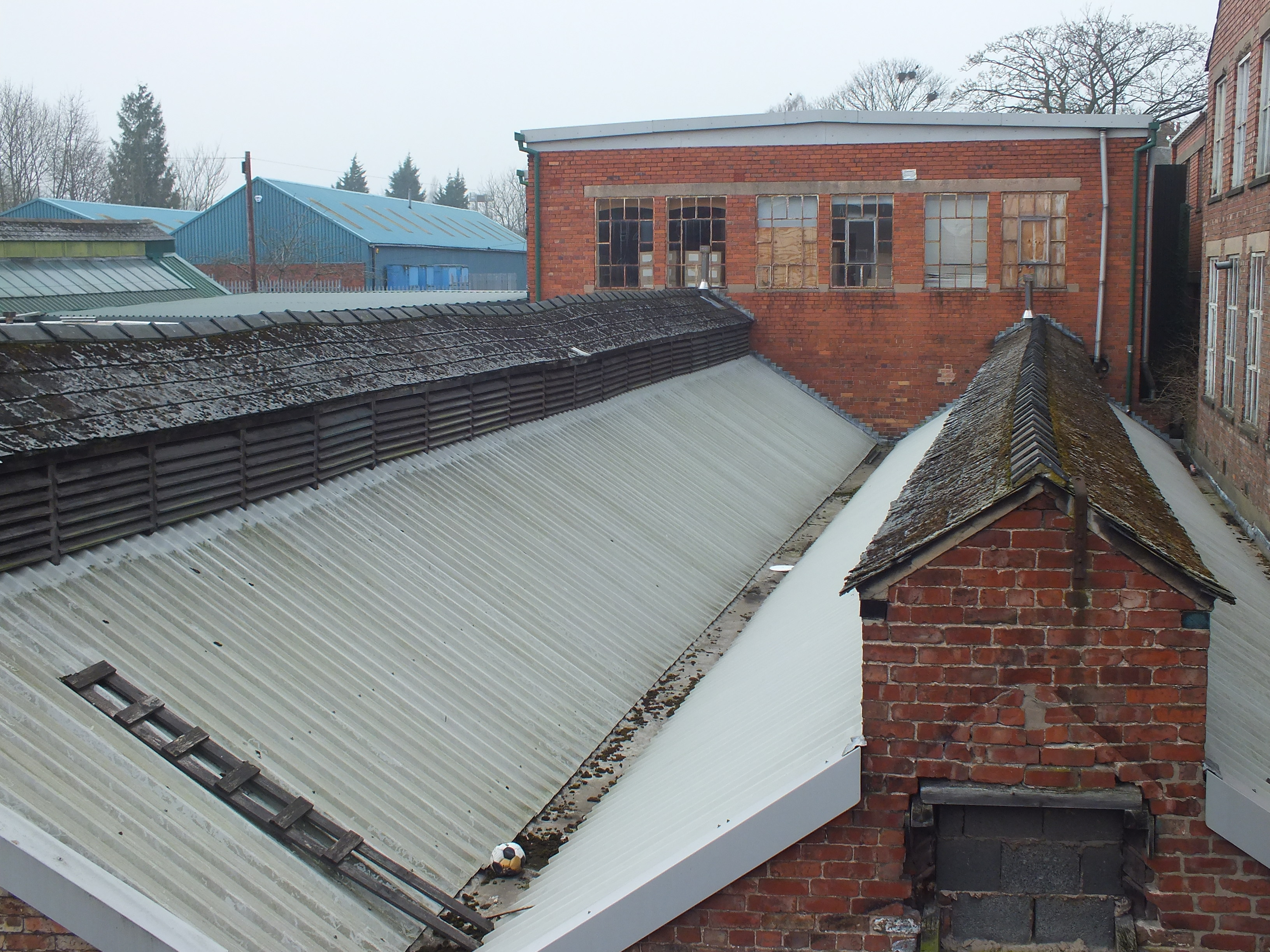
Dyeing sheds at Chester Road Mill, Macclesfield

The single storey sheds used for dyeing can be recognised by the louvred ventilators on their roofs.

Printing was done on long tables using engraved blocks, later the tables were used for silk screen printing. Whiston's (BWA) at Langley, Cheshire amassed the world's largest collection of wooden blocks.

=== Silk mills ===
There remain a large number of buildings in the Cheshire silk-weaving towns that can be called silk mills, from complexes of large six-storey buildings with attached one storey weaving sheds to the small garret loom shop employing just one family. As the economic balance changed, buildings would switch from silk to cotton and back again; they would change their function from throwing, to dyeing, printing or making up. Buildings would be divided from one owner working the silk in a vertical mill, to multiple tenants who would specialise in different aspects of the industry. And still yarn would be put out to independent weavers.

The first mills were modelled on Lombe's Mill, there were austere brick buildings of four, five or six storeys, similar to those found in the naval dockyards. They were 22 feet (6.7 m) wide, to accommodate the Italian filatoio. By 1820 throwing was done on rectangular frames and the width of the building was dependent solely on the strength of the floor beam. Spans greater than 8 m needed to be supported by cast iron pillars. Silk does not require the fire-proof construction techniques essential for cotton so are lighter in construction. In 1820 Jacquard equipped looms entered the mills. These were significantly taller than previous looms so mills needed to be built with increased floor heights. These are instantly recognised by the tall windows.

Waste spinning, reeling, doubling and throwing put little strain on the building, but power-looms were a different matter. From preference they were operated in single-storey sheds with saw-tooth north-facing roof windows: if they were to be operated on an upper-floor, box-beams and cast-iron columns increased the floor strength and load-bearing capacities.

== History of silk working in Cheshire ==
Silk was being worked in Cheshire in the late Middle Ages and used for the manufacture of silk-covered buttons. The Macclesfield town records note a debt from a button maker in 1574. In an inventory of Stephen Rowe's house in 1617 – amounts of raw materials, namely hair, thread, linen yarn and silk – quantities of finished buttons- four gross – and in addition goods to the value of £3 9s 6d put forth to out workers. He would have used a chapman to market his buttons. Chapmen could be merchants who rode through the villages hawking their silkcloth and buttons, but many owned land and traded directly with the London. London was the only legal port of entry for silk, so consequently London merchants came to Macclesfield with the raw silk and some became freemen of Macclesfield so they could legally trade within the town. These merchants sometimes had local factors who would buy and sell on their behalf.

=== Silk weaving ===
Silk processing skills were established in England by French Protestant Huguenots refugees after they had been expelled France following the Revocation of the Edict of Nantes in 1685. They prospered in Spitalfields, outside the bounds of the City of London, where they avoided the restrictive legislation of the City Guilds. But silk-throwing was already happening in Cheshire, for example in Rainow where a John Massey is recorded as owning one black cow, some sheep, three old ladders and a silk twisting wheel. Lace weaving was already under way in Stockport, Macclesfield, Congleton, Leek and Buxton in around 1660. Narrow silk weaving was happening in Macclesfield by 1696, while John Prout (1829) states that broad-silk weaving commenced in 1756.

Silk was woven in Cheshire by independent weavers who had hand looms in their own homes. They worked as outworkers for merchants, who supplied them with silk and bought the cloth. This was a common rural practice. With the improvement in the looms and the flying shuttle and the increase in demand for the finished product there was difficulty in finding enough silk.

=== Silk throwing ===
Silk was prepared for weaving by hand-throwing the silk. This was originally an outdoor activity, conducted under long shades, but when it moved into 23-metre-long buildings they also were called shades. In Italy they found a way to do this using machines.

Lombe's Mill in Derby was the first successful powered silk-throwing mill in England. John Lombe visited a successful silk-throwing mill in Piedmont in 1717, and returned to England with details of the Italian silk-throwing machines – the filatoio and torcitoio and with some Italian craftsman-built replicas. This was an early example of industrial espionage. The architect George Sorocold built it next to Thomas Cotchett's failed 1704 mill (which used copies of Dutch throwing machines) on the west bank of the River Derwent. He and his half-brother Thomas Lombe, born 1685, instructed George Sorocold to build a mill for the Italian-style machines. To the north of the powered Italian works an un-powered doubling shop was built at some time before 1739, and when this mill was sold in 1739 to Thomas Wilson an inventory taken which still exists today. Thomas Lombe was given a 14-year patent to protect the design of the throwing machines he used. The King of Sardinia responded to this challenge badly, and stopped exporting suitable raw silk. It is speculated that he was responsible for John Lombe's mysterious death six years later in 1722. His elder brother, Thomas Lombe, took over the business.

When the patent lapsed in 1732, other mills were built in Stockport (1732) and Macclesfield (1744) and Congleton (1753). Italian-style silk throwing had reached Cheshire.

=== Stockport ===
Lombe's patent had been fiercely contested by artisans in Stockport and Macclesfield who looked to supply the Spitalfield silk weavers. When the patent expired, a partnership of six was formed in Stockport, which in essence was a joint stock company, to build a water-powered mill in a bend in the River Mersey, next to Logwood Mill 53°24′46″N 2°09′27″W. John Guardivaglio was recruited to manage the new technology. John Clayton, a future Mayor was the partnership leader and Samuel Oldknow was also a partner. Samuel Oldknow later introduced cotton to Stockport in 1784, capitalising on the machine manufacturing and textile skills developed in silk. From map evidence it is speculated that this was a small mill that would house two Italian filatoio. It took until 1743 to cut the tunnels to obtain extra water from New Bridge. Seven years later the silk mill owners bought the neighbouring Logwood Mill and converted that to silk. As this was only 23 feet (7.0 m) square it could only be used for ancillary processes.44

In 1749 there was a reduction on the duty on imported raw silk. This prompted John Clayton and his new partner Nathaniel Pattison, a silk merchant from London, to raise £5000, and secure the water rights and the agreement of the town council to build the Old Mill at Congleton. The five-storey mill was far larger than previous mills, aiming to benefit from economies of scale.

=== Macclesfield ===
==== Buttons ====
The Mottershead family were involved in the early Macclesfield silk button trade and through a series of letters it is revealed that there was a sizeable trade from 1649. It was a cottage industry involving women and children. In 1698 the corporation directed that 'poor children or other poor' should be instructed in the making of buttons. They then could then be employed as 'outworkers' for Macclesfield merchants who bought the materials wholesale and then marketed the finished buttons. Samuel Finney of Wilmslow described this and explained that a good woman could earn four shillings a week, and even a child of six could support themselves by assisting in the preparatory processes. In 1749 the manufacture of silk buttons was the principal industry of the town, but by 1795 it had been superseded, as buttons made from horn became more common. The legacy was a pool of labour with silk preparation skills, and established lines of supply and distribution. In 1765 it is estimated that 15,000 people were working in silk in the town and the surrounding villages.

Some buttons were traded by chapmen, but others were sent via Manchester and exported through Bristol and London to the Netherlands, New York and Moscow. John Brocḱlehurst was such a chapman and he enter partnership in 1745 with Messrs Acton and Street who were 'putters out'. Charles Roe was a silk button merchant. Woven silk was obtained from the Huguenots in Spitalfield, who in turn used the yarn supplied by the silk throwsters in small shades or throwing houses in Macclesfield.

==== Throwing ====
Charles Roe built the Button Mill in 1743, where he installed two Italian filatoio (water-driven throwing machines of the type used in Derby), and a dye house. The mill expanded and by 1761 it was employing 350 persons. Other throwing mills followed, such as Frost's Mill on Park Green which was founded in 1775 by Daintry and Ryle. John Hadfield had a mill on the River Bollin, and around this time the first Chester Road Mill was built.

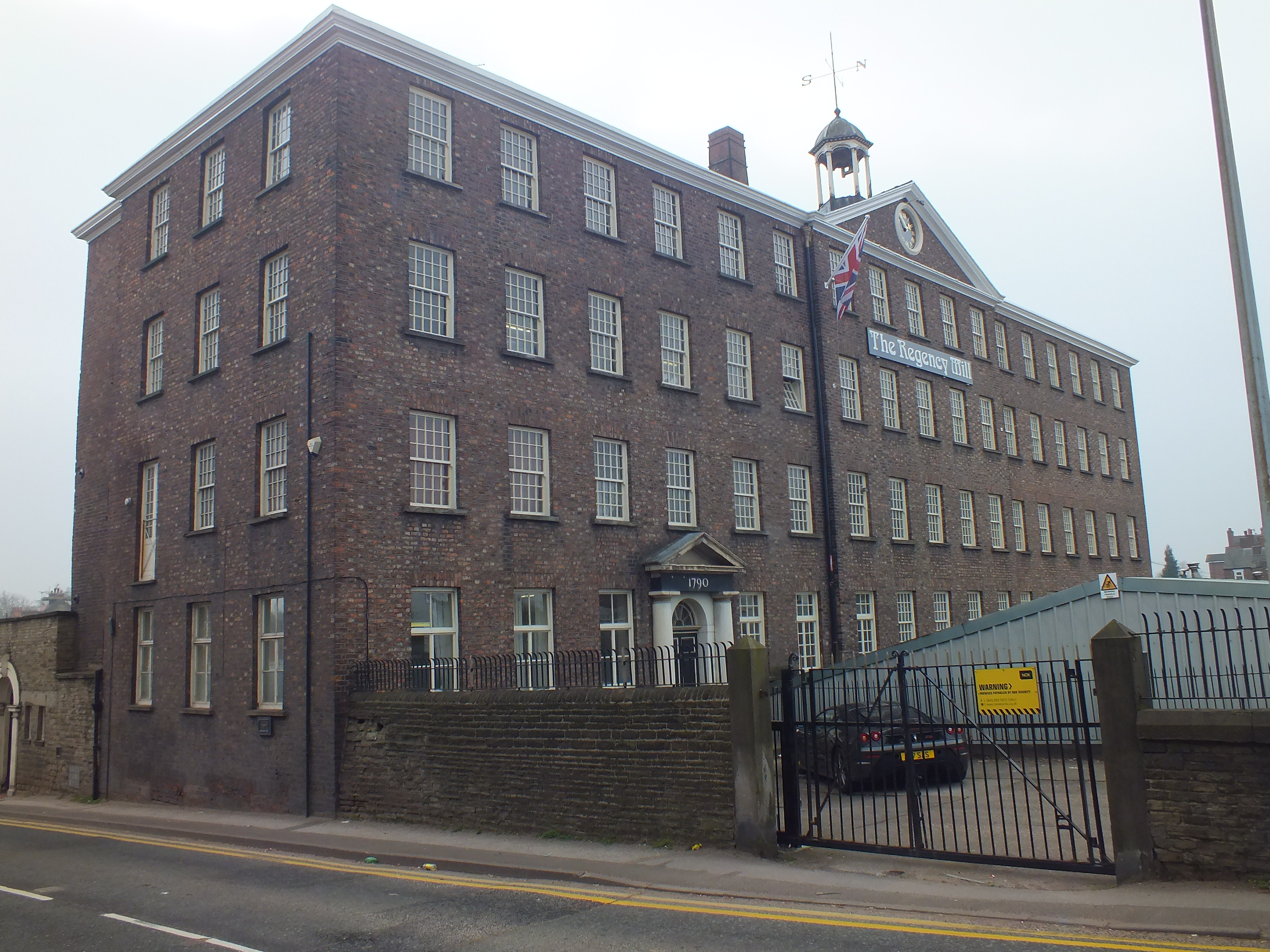
Chester Road Mill, with the date 1790 above the door.

Macclesfield prospered. Men in throwing earned 7s a week while men on the land earned 6s. Women earned 3s 6d, and children on a three-year contract started on 6d a week in the first year, then 9d in the second and a whole shilling in the third year. This was for twelve hours a day for a six-day week. Demand increased while Britain was at war with France, but peace caused years of depression. Charles Roe left the silk industry in 1760, selling his share in his business for £10,000, and when the Seven Years' War finished in 1763, there was great hardship. Macclesfield did not weave silk at this time but supplied the thread to Spitalfields. There, there was unrest and large demonstrations which were supported by smaller ones in Park Green and the Market Place. Workers formed combinations. An Act of Parliament in 1773 regulated the wage rates and the number or apprenticeship places in Spitalfields.

==== Weaving ====
In 1790 the weaving of silk was introduced into Macclesfield by Leigh and Voce who introduced looms, and Huguenot weavers to teach the skills, into a loomshop in Back Street. One of the weavers, Margaret Moborn was induced to leave and work for the James Pearson in a weaving shed in Sunderland Street. It was James's father George who had invited John Wesley to preach in Macclefield. Margaret lived with James for several years as well as teaching the principles of weaving and warping. George Pearson and Sons became the leading silk weavers here in the early nineteenth century. Britain was again at war with France between 1793 and 1815 so weaving prospered. A good employed weaver could earn eighteen shillings a week, and a self-employed weaver up to £3. but he would have the costs of maintaining his apprentices. In general by the end of the French Wars a pattern has been set, of power and hand throwing, waste silk working and weaving by hand in weaving sheds in independent homes.

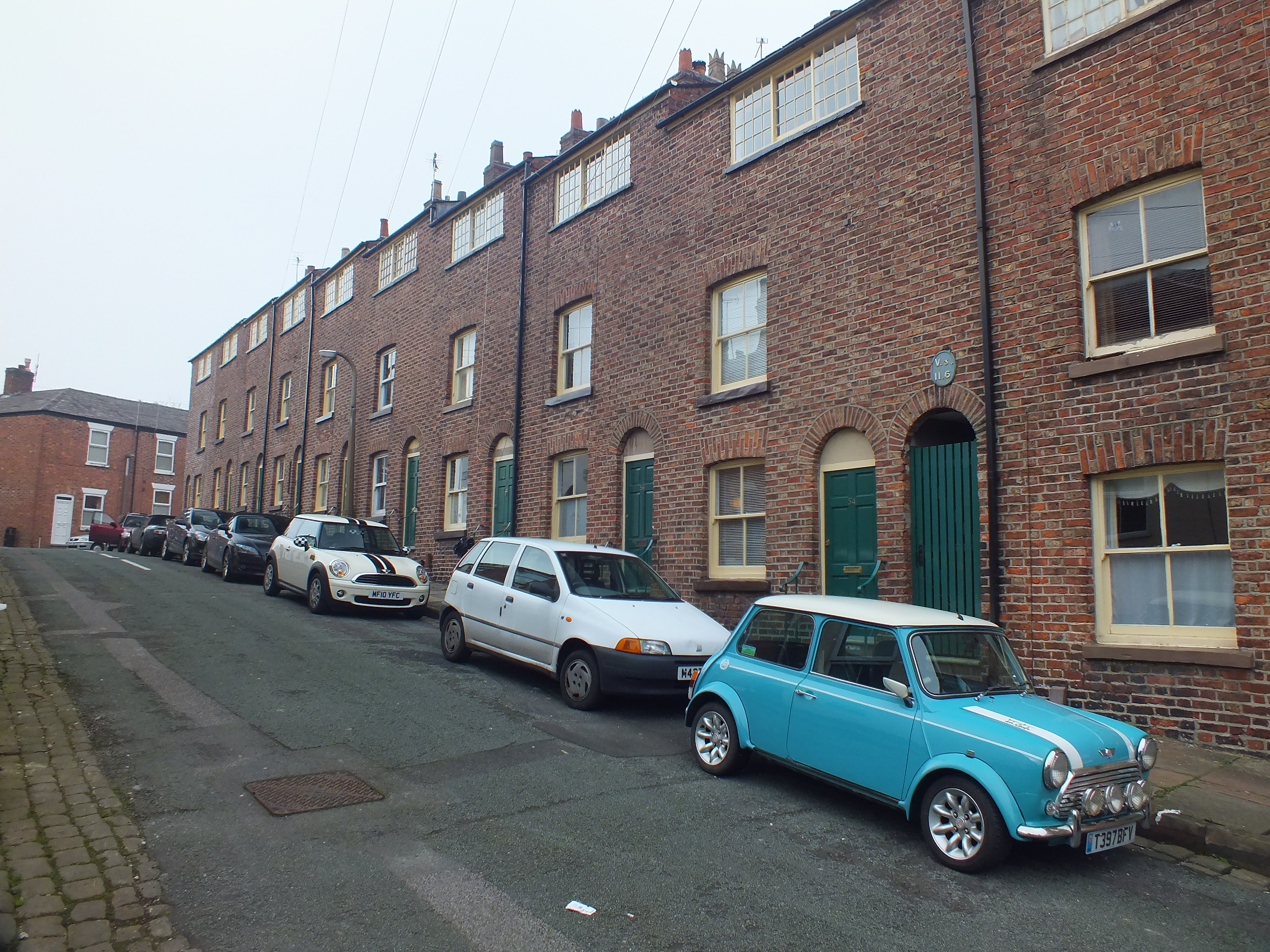
Paradise Street, a row of weavers cottages with the wide windows typical of a garret loomshop

The years between 1815 and 1820 were ones of recession, followed by the boom of the 1820s. Twenty six throwing mills were established, and the throwsters often attached weaving sheds. The workforce was divided equally between the employed and outworkers and weaving was all done by hand. In 1821 the population was 21,819, and about 10,000 were employed in the silk factories- some of course would come in from the surrounding villages. They worked a 62-hour week, men earning eleven shillings. Duties on finished silk and raw silk were reduced in 1824, 1825 and 1826. Firms went bankrupt and while there were 70 silk mills in 1826 by 1832 there were only 41. Wages halved, and workers were put on short time. Recessions continued on a ten yearly cycle and as fewer firms survived, the techniques were refined, new products were produced, and management became more adept. Brocklehursts was the largest of these firms.

In the 1830s the power-driven loom was perfected, and throwing was done on a metal frame, similar to a throstle. These could be incorporated into existing buildings. The Jacquard head was introduced onto hand looms in the 1820s. Because the Jacquard head was placed on top of the standard loom, an increased ceiling height as needed to accommodate them. Power looms were only suitable for coarse broad cloths, and hand looms continued to be used for the finest silks and the complex Jacquard work. In 1839, two silk workers James Mayers and John Ryle left the town and on the Marion sailed to New Jersey settling in the town of Paterson. Together they opened mills (1846) and established the American silk weaving industry. In hard times 3,000 townsfolk left and joined them, and in 1900 the Paterson newspaper regularly included the Births, Marriages and Deaths column from the Macclesfield Chronicle.

After 1850 silk manufacture stopped in Stockport and in other towns, and Macclesfield became known as 'the silk town'. At the Great Exhibition in 1851 Macclesfield firms exhibited calgees, Bandanna handkerchiefs, velvets, satins ribbons and shawls. The industry contracted as fashion showed a preference for cottons and French silk. The workforce contracted to 5,000 in 1886. Prominent silk families such as that of John Brocklehurst and John Birchenough were also active in civic and religious life. Most were keen non-conformists and built chapels for their workers. Silk paid for the education of the poor. Macclesfield Sunday School was founded in 1796 by non-conformists, and the large building that now houses the Heritage Centre was built in 1813–1815. Here 2,500 children each year received a formal education on their one-day off from work. The Anglicans built the National School on Duke Street as a response. It remained in use as a day school until 1960. The technical skills that an apprentice would need were provided by a Technical School, and there was a School of Art where designers were trained.

==== Printing ====
The most significant printing firm in the area was that founded by William Smith at Langley in 1820. This passed into the family of William Whiston and his son Harold W. Whiston. It amalgamated with J & T Brocklehurst in 1929 to form BWA, Brocklehurst Whiston Amalgamated. They finished fabrics by tyeing and dyeing, wax resist printing with indigo, and copperplate printing. They printed from engraved wooden blocks and using hand-operated silk screens. They had their own wood engraving shop. By 1900 they had 90,000 hand printing blocks: the largest collection in Europe. These were burnt when the department closed.

Hand embroidery was a cottage craft, Augustus William Hewetson came to Macclesfield at fourteen, on the death of his father. He studied at the School of Art and at 21, he purchased four Swiss pantograph machines and set up business as a machine embroiderer in George Street in 1898, moving to Albion Mill in 1904.

==== Weaving ====
In 1790 the weaving of silk was introduced into Macclesfield by Leigh and Voce who introduced looms, and Huguenot weavers to teach the skills, into a loomshop in Back Street. One of the weavers, Margaret Moborn was induced to leave and work for the James Pearson in a weaving shed in Sunderland Street. It was James's father George who had invited John Wesley to preach in Macclefield. Margaret lived with James for several years as well as teaching the principles of weaving and warping. George Pearson and Sons became the leading silk weavers here in the early nineteenth century. Britain was again at war with France between 1793 and 1815 so weaving prospered. A good employed weaver could earn eighteen shillings a week, and a self-employed weaver up to £3. but he would have the costs of maintaining his apprentices. In general by the end of the French Wars a pattern has been set, of power and hand throwing, waste silk working and weaving by hand in weaving sheds in independent homes.

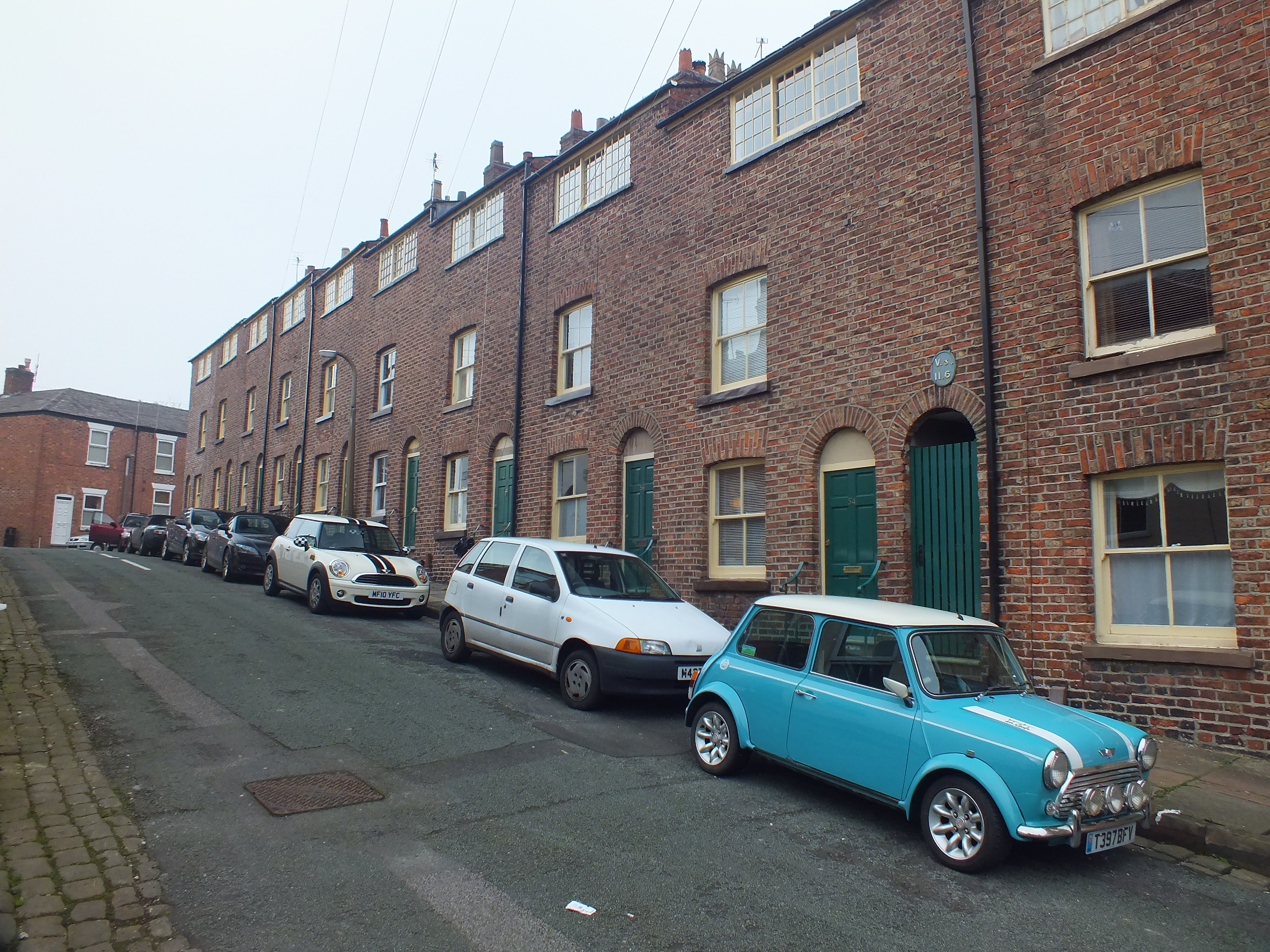
Paradise Street, a row of weavers cottages with the wide windows typical of a garret loomshop

The years between 1815 and 1820 were ones of recession, followed by the boom of the 1820s. Twenty six throwing mills were established, and the throwsters often attached weaving sheds. The workforce was divided equally between the employed and outworkers and weaving was all done by hand. In 1821 the population was 21,819, and about 10,000 were employed in the silk factories- some of course would come in from the surrounding villages. They worked a 62-hour week, men earning eleven shillings. Duties on finished silk and raw silk were reduced in 1824, 1825 and 1826. Firms went bankrupt and while there were 70 silk mills in 1826 by 1832 there were only 41. Wages halved, and workers were put on short time. Recessions continued on a ten yearly cycle and as fewer firms survived, the techniques were refined, new products were produced, and management became more adept. Brocklehursts was the largest of these firms.

In the 1830s the power-driven loom was perfected, and throwing was done on a metal frame, similar to a throstle. These could be incorporated into existing buildings. The Jacquard head was introduced onto hand looms in the 1820s. Because the Jacquard head was placed on top of the standard loom, an increased ceiling height was needed to accommodate them. Power looms were only suitable for coarse broad cloths, and hand looms continued to be used for the finest silks and the complex Jacquard work. In 1839, two silk workers James Mayers and John Ryle left the town and on the Marion sailed to New Jersey settling in the town of Paterson. Together they opened mills (1846) and established the American silk weaving industry. In hard times 3,000 townsfolk left and joined them, and in 1900 the Paterson newspaper regularly included the Births, Marriages and Deaths column from the Macclesfield Chronicle.

After 1850 silk manufacture stopped in Stockport and in other towns, and Macclesfield became known as 'the silk town'. At the Great Exhibition in 1851 Macclesfield firms exhibited calgees, Bandanna handkerchiefs, velvets, satins ribbons and shawls. The industry contracted as fashion showed a preference for cottons and French silk. The workforce contracted to 5,000 in 1886. Prominent silk families such as that of John Brocklehurst and John Birchenough were also active in civic and religious life. Most were keen non-conformists and built chapels for their workers. Silk paid for the education of the poor. Macclesfield Sunday School was founded in 1796 by non-conformists, and the large building that now houses the Heritage Centre was built in 1813–1815. Here 2,500 children each year received a formal education on their one-day off from work. The Anglicans built the National School on Duke Street as a response. It remained in use as a day school until 1960. The technical skills that an apprentice would need were provided by a Technical School, and there was a School of Art where designers were trained.

== See also ==
- Derby Industrial Museum
- Silk
- Textile manufacture during the Industrial Revolution
