= Silk mill =

Factory that makes silk for garments

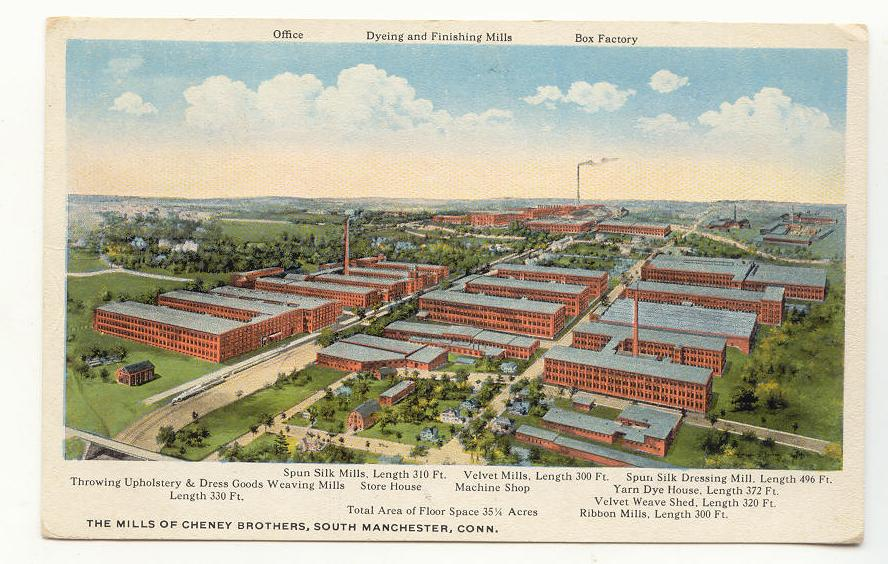
A 1920 illustration of the Cheney Brothers Historic District silk mill in Manchester, Connecticut

A silk mill is a factory that makes silk for garments using a process called silk throwing. Traditionally, silk mills were concentrated in Japan, England, New Jersey, Pennsylvania, Italy and Switzerland.

== Silk throwing process ==
Silk is a naturally produced fibre obtained from many species of the silk moth. In 1700 the favoured silk was produced by a moth (Bombyx mori), that spun a cocoon to protect the larvae. The larvae fed on mulberry leaves grown in Italy. Silk fibres from the Bombyx mori silkworm have a triangular cross section with rounded corners, 5–10 μm wide. The silk is a protein, fibroin, that was cemented in place by the use of gum, another protein, sericin.

The cocoons were harvested and placed in troughs of hot water to dissolve the gum and allow the single thread to be wound into a skein. The skeins were placed into bales and taken to the mill for processing. Three sorts of yarn could be produced: no-twist which was suitable for weft, tram that had received a slight twist making it easier to handle, and organzine which had a greater twist and was suitable for use as warp.

Reeling is the industrial process where silk that has been wound into skeins, is cleaned, receives a twist and is wound onto bobbins.

Silk throwing is the process where the thread from the bobbins is twisted again to form tram and or organzine. The yarn is twisted together into threads, in a process known as doubling. Colloquially silk throwing can be used to refer to the whole process: reeling, throwing and doubling.

== History ==
Italians were the first to build mills that contained anything more than a set of spinning wheels. Thomas Cotchett's mill, was built in Derby in 1704, and was a failure. John Lombe had visited the successful silk throwing mill in Piedmont in 1716, an early example of industrial espionage. He returned to Derby with the necessary knowledge, with details of the Italian silk throwing machines – the filatoio and the torcitoio – and some Italian craftsmen. He designed the mill, and with his half-brother Thomas Lombe (born 1685) instructed George Sorocold to build it and fit it with the new machines. Lombe's Mill was the first successful silk throwing mill in England and probably the first fully mechanised factory in the world. Between 1717 and 1721 George built the mill, beside the River Derwent to the south of Cotchett's failed Mill to house machines for "doubling" or twisting silk into thread. The machines required large buildings and a power source. An undershot water wheel turned by the mill fleam served the purpose.

John Lombe was given a 14-year patent to protect the design of the throwing machines. The King of Sardinia reacted badly to the commercial challenge, placing an embargo on the export of raw silk. John's elder brother, Sir Thomas Lombe, took over the business. When the patents lapsed in 1732, other mills were built in Stockport and Macclesfield.

"The original Italian works of five storeys high housed 26 Italian winding engines that spun the raw silk on each of the upper three floors whilst the lower two storeys contained eight spinning mills producing basic thread and four twist mills."

The throwing machines were two storeys high and pierced the first floor. The winding machines were situated on the top three floors. All the machines were powered by Sorocold's seven-metre diameter, two-metre wide external undershot waterwheel. That drove a line shaft that ran the length of the mill. The torcitoios and filatoios took their power from the shaft. The mill was heated to process the silk, and this was explained in the 1718 patent: It was reported that Lombe used a fire engine (steam engine) to pump hot air round the mill .

The circular spinning machines (also known as 'throwing machines'), were the most significant innovation of the factory. Together with the single source of power (water), and the large size and organisation of the workforce for the period (200-400, according to contemporary sources), the total process of production from raw silk to fine quality thread has led the Lombes' silk mill to be described as the first successful use of the factory system in Britain.

=== United States ===
The history of industrial silk in the United States is largely tied to several smaller urban centres in the Northeast region. Beginning in the 1830s, Manchester, Connecticut emerged as the early centre of the silk industry, when the Cheney Brothers became the first to raise silkworms on an industrial scale. With the mulberry tree craze of that decade, other smaller producers began raising silkworms: this economy gained traction around Northampton, Massachusetts and Williamsburg, where a number of small firms and cooperatives emerged. William Skinner, relocated from there to the then-new city of Holyoke after the 1874 flood. Over the next 50 years he and his sons would maintain relations between the American silk industry and its counterparts in Japan, and by 1911, the Skinner Mill complex contained the world's largest silk mill under one roof: Skinner Fabrics had become the largest manufacturer of silk satins internationally. Other efforts later in the 19th century would also bring the new silk industry to Paterson, New Jersey, with several firms hiring European-born textile workers and granting it the nickname "Silk City".

World War II interrupted the Asian silk trade, and silk prices increased dramatically. U.S. industry began to look for substitutes, which led to the use of synthetics such as nylon. Synthetic silks have also been made from lyocell, a type of cellulose fibre, and are often difficult to distinguish from real silk (see spider silk for more on synthetic silks).

=== Industrial unrest ===
In New Jersey, disputes between silk mill workers and owners lead to the 1913 Paterson silk strike and the 1926 Passaic textile strike

== Examples ==
- American Silk Mills, Paterson, New Jersey, founded in 1905 by Edward Rubin (died 1939), a Russian-born furrier residing in New York City at 22 E. 93rd St.
- Auburn Button Works and Logan Silk Mills, Auburn in Cayuga County, New York
- Ashley and Bailey Company Silk Mill (also known as Franklin Silk Mill and Leinhardt Brothers Furniture Warehouse), a historic silk mill located at West York, York County
- Bellemonte Silk Mill, Hawley, Wayne County
- Bethlehem Silk Mill, Bethlehem, Northampton County
- Diamond Silk Mill (also known as York Silk Manufacturing Company), a historic silk mill located at Springettsbury Township, York County
- Lansdale Silk Hosiery Compy-Interstate Hosiery Mills, Inc., a historic silk mill located at Lansdale, Montgomery County
- Lehigh Valley Silk Mills, Fountain Hill, Northampton County
- Lister Mills, Bradford, England, built in 1871, known for being the largest silk mill in the world.
- Logwood Mill, Stockport, England, built in 1732
- Lombe's Mill, Derby, the first successful silk throwing mill in England, built in 1721.
- McCollum and Post Silk Mill, Nazareth, Northampton County
- Old Mill, Congleton, England, built in 1753
- The Royal Button Mill, Macclesfield, England, built in 1744

== See also ==
- Cotton mill
