= Bath Street Mill =

Sikl throwing mill in Derby, Derbyshire, England

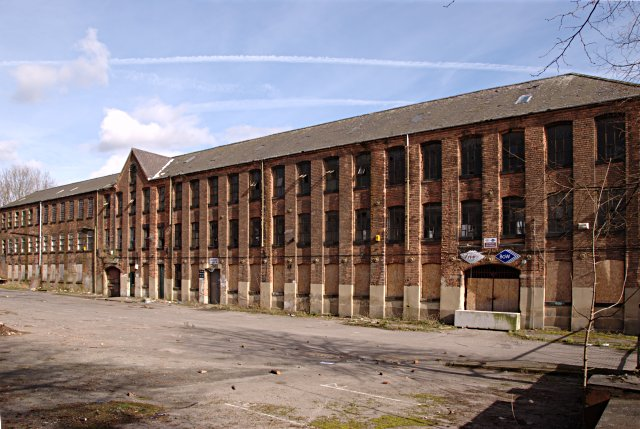
- The mill in 2008

- Location in Derbyshire

Silk
- Alternative names: Holme's Mill

Silk throwing mill
- Location: Derby, Derbyshire, England
- Serving canal: Derby Canal
- Serving railway: GNR
- Owner: George Holme
- Coordinates: 52.9297°N 1.4780°W

Construction
- Built: 1851
- Renovated: 1868
- Destroyed: By fire in 2009
- Floor count: 3
- Floor area: 12 bays extended to 32 bays

Bath Street Mill was a silk throwing mill in Derby, built in 1851 for George Holme. In spite of the recession in the silk industry in 1857, he expanded the mill in 1868. In 2008 plans were made to convert the mill into flats and offices, but the building was damaged beyond repair by a fire in June 2009, and later demolished.

== Location ==
The Bath Street area of Derby, was part of the land of William Strutt. His son Edward released it for development in 1815. Bath Street had been extended when the mill was built in 1851. This area of Derby is a conservation area, and part of the Derwent Valley Mills World Heritage Site.

== History ==
Built in brick as a silk mill in 1851, it was three storeys high and 12 bays wide with cast-iron attic windows made at the local foundry. At the north end, there was a small building at right angles built to house the steam engine which powered the mill. In 1868, the mill was extended southwards by a further 20 bays by the architect S Morley. The roof line shows the join.

The mill had a wharf on the River Derwent, which was linked to the Derby Canal south of St Mary's Bridge. In 1876–78 the Great Northern Railway built a siding connected to a head-shunt at Darley Grove.

The mill's founder was George Holme (1813–1896), the second son of a Derby shoe maker Daniel Holme. His elder brother, also called Daniel, became a clockmaker but George initially followed his father's trade, taking over the firm on his death in 1840. Soon afterwards, he was listed as a "boot and shoe & silk manufacturer". The footwear manufacturing continued for some time after the establishment of the Bath Street Mill.

Holme diversified into silk-throwing due to a surge in demand for silk goods in the 1840s, and by 1857, he had diversified into manufacturing elastic web and gussets. Then that year, 1857 the protective tariffs, which had allowed English silk- throwing to flourish in Derby since 1718, were removed. The UK silk- throwing industry plunged into a sharp decline and this caused the closure of several Derby firms. Bath Street Mill was the first to produce silk elastic web on power looms in Derby and the mill was able to expand in 1868.

The rear yards were covered over with weaving sheds for an expansion into the manufacture of woollen goods – another milestone for the firm, for it was the first to produce wool serge and lastings in Derby. By the 1870s George's eldest son, also George, was running the business, and by 1891 there were almost 300 employees. George (senior) served on the town council and was Mayor of Derby, 1874–75.

His grandson (another George), took over the firm after 1894. By 1904, the firm began to contract and almost two-thirds of the mill was let to a pair of textile firms. One of these businesses was the Derby Cotton Mill Co. It was run by D E Spriggs and A R Spriggs. The cotton mill closed on 24 June 1958– all the looms were smashed for scrap, as no buyer could be found.

When Geo Holme & Company ceased to trade, after the First World War, and its portion of the mill was, by 1925, occupied by shoe and slipper manufacturer Maden & Ireland. All parts of the mill were rented out.

In 2008 planning permission was approved to enlarge and convert the mill to 93 flats and offices. Before any work had taken place, the building was damaged beyond repair by a fire in June 2009. Permission was subsequently granted to demolish the historic building and to erect a block of 82 extra care flats on the site. The remains of Bath Street Mill were demolished in 2013.

== Usage ==
- Silk throwing
- Woollen
- Cotton weaving
- Shoe making

== See also ==
- List of mills in Derbyshire
- Textile manufacturing
- Cotton Mill
