= Thomas Lombe =

English merchant and silk throwing machine developer

Sir Thomas Lombe
- Born: 5 September 1685; England
- Died: 8 January 1739 (aged 53); City of London, England, Great Britain
- Occupation(s): Merchant, inventor
- Known for: Lombe's Mill
- Spouse: Elizabeth Turner
- Children: 2
- Relatives: John Lombe (half-brother)

Sir Thomas Lombe (5 September 1685 – 8 January 1739) was an English merchant and developer of machinery for silk throwing.

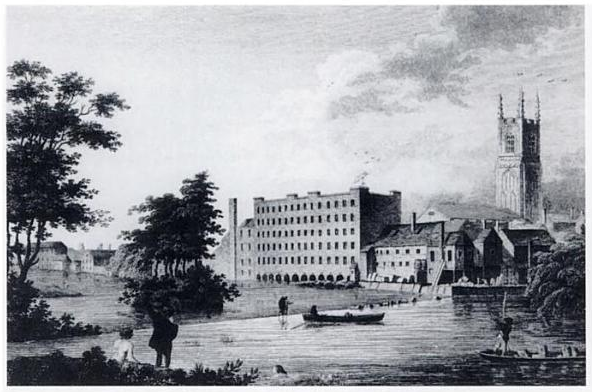
Lombe's Mill

== Early life ==
Lombe was born the eldest son of Henry Lombe, a worsted weaver in Norwich who died in 1695. Thomas and his brother John, the oldest of the four sons, were cared for by his executors after his death, while their brothers, Benjamin and John, were brought up by their mother, Henry Lombe's second wife.

== Career ==
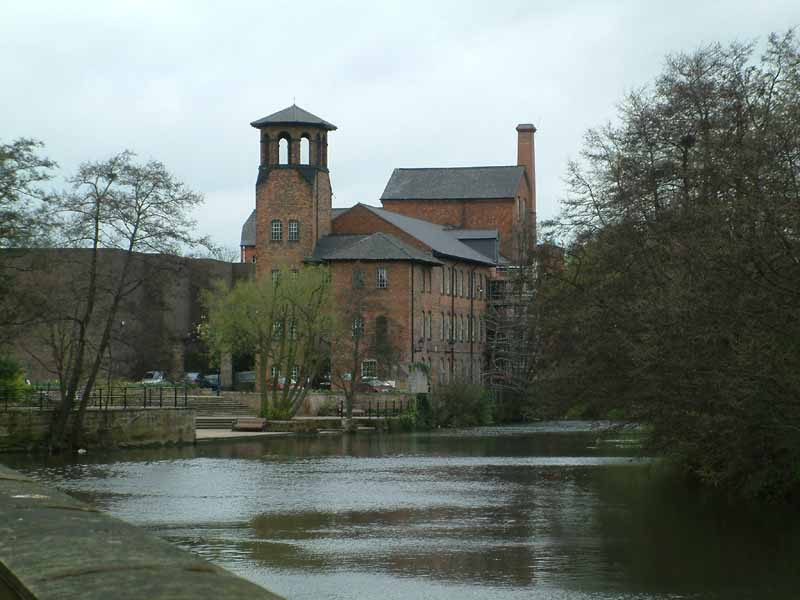
Lombe's Mill site today, rebuilt as Derby Silk Mill

In the early years of the 18th century, Lombe was apprentice to Samuel Totton, a mercer, and admitted to the freedom of the Mercers' Company in 1707. In the same year, he became a freeman of the City of London. He eventually established himself as a merchant. He obtained a patent (No. 422) in 1718 for "three sorts of engines never before made or used in Great Britaine, one to winde the finest raw silk, another to spin, and the other to twist the finest Italian raw silk into organzine in great perfection, which was never before done in this country." Lombe employed his half-brother John Lombe to learn Italian silk processes.

The Lombes set up a new mill at Derby in 1719, on an island in the River Derwent, adjacent to a disused mill that had belonged to Thomas Cotchett and was built by George Sorocold. It eventually became a lucrative concern known as Lombe's Mill. The patent expired in 1732, when Lombe petitioned Parliament for an extension, a move opposed by cotton and worsted spinners. The bill was thrown out but a subsequent Act awarded Lombe £14,000, one of the conditions being that he should deposit models of his machinery in a public institution. Models were placed in the Tower of London. Lombe was an alderman of Bassishaw ward in the City of London, and was chosen sheriff of London in 1727. He was knighted on 8 July of the same year, when he attended at court to present a congratulatory address from the city to George II on his accession.

After Lombe's death in 1739, Lombe's Mill was sold to Samuel Lloyd and William Wilson. It continued to spin silk until 1890, when it partly collapsed. In the 1740s, Charles Roe built mills based on Lombe's in Macclesfield. A description of Lombe's machinery appeared in Rees's Cyclopædia.

== Personal life ==
Lombe married Elizabeth Turner, with whom he had two daughters, Hannah and Mary Turner. He died on 8 January 1739 at his house in Old Jewry. His fortune of £120,000, bequeathed equally to his widow and daughters. Mary Turner married James Maitland, 7th Earl of Lauderdale on 24 April 1749. Hannah married Sir Robert Clifton, 5th Baronet in 1740. Elizabeth Turner Lombe died on 18 November 1753.

== Notes ==
This article incorporates text from a publication now in the public domain: Lee, Sidney, ed. (1893). "Lombe, Thomas". Dictionary of National Biography. Vol. 34. London: Smith, Elder & Co.
