= John Lombe =

English silk spinner (1693–1722)

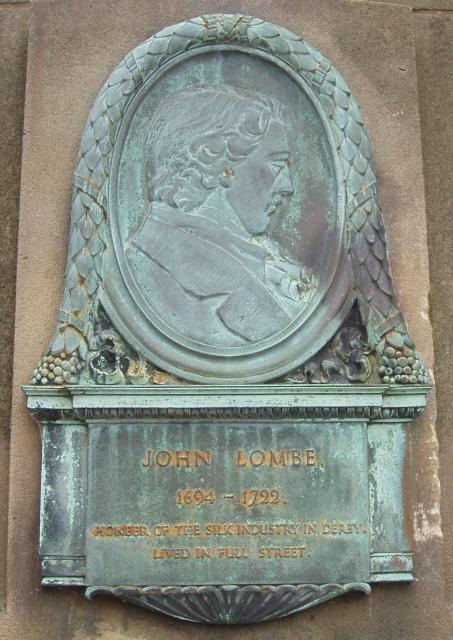
Portrait of John Lombe from the Exeter Bridge in Derby

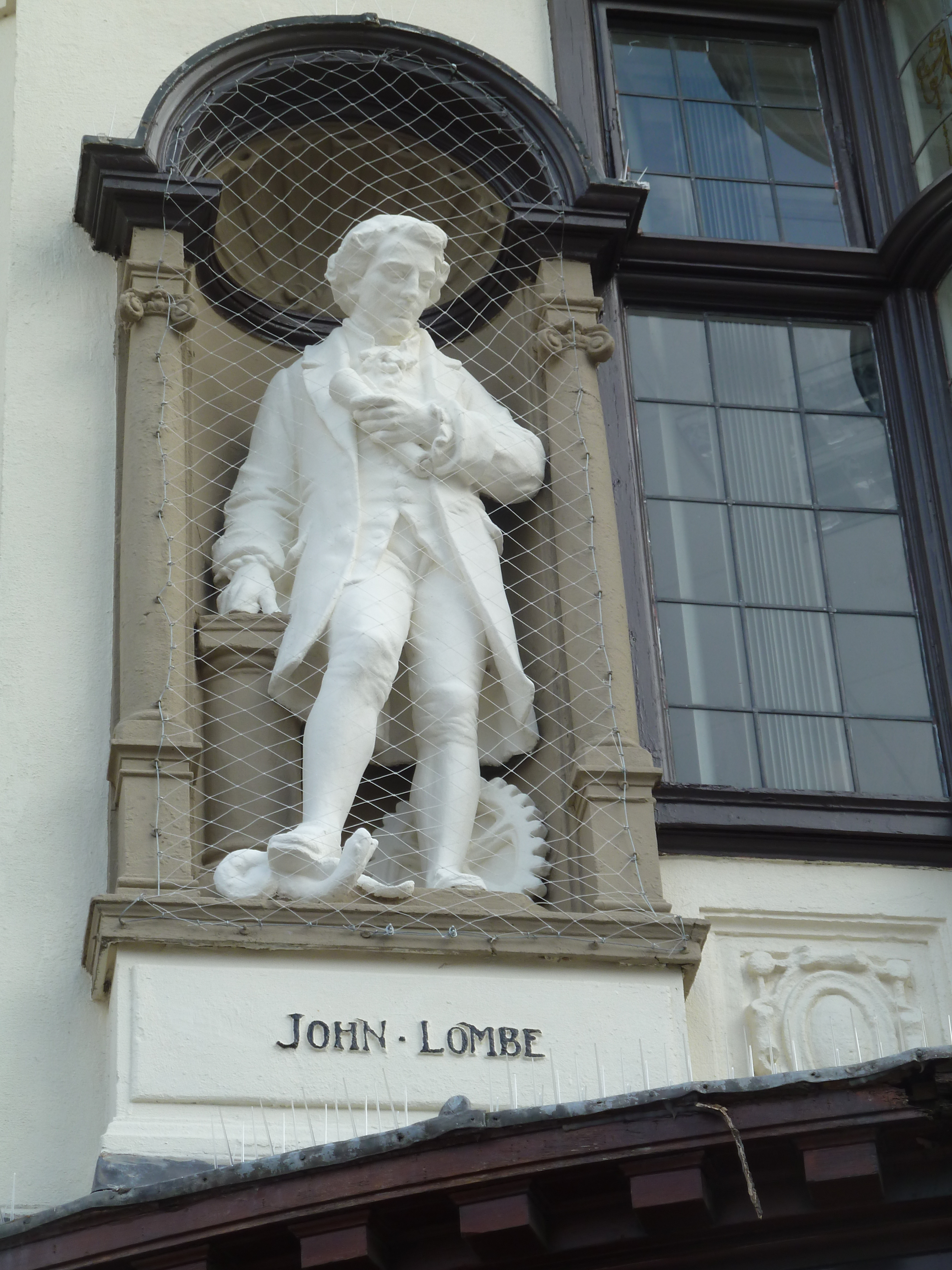
Statue of John Lombe in Derby (Former Boots building, East Street

John Lombe (1693 in Norwich – 20 November 1722 in Derby) was an English silk spinner in the 18th century Derby, England.

== Biography ==
Lombe was born in Norwich in approximately 1693, the son of a worsted weaver. He was a younger half-brother of Thomas Lombe who, after John's death, would go on to amass a fortune as a silk merchant in Norwich and London.

In the early 18th century, the centre for producing silk stockings by framework knitting had moved to the Midlands from London and the demand for spun silk was outstripping supply. Lombe had obtained employment at an abortive silk mill built in Derby by George Sorocold for the silk spinner Thomas Cotchett of Derby, built on the River Derwent.

The Italians had been using power spinning since the early 15th century, with a description published by Vittorio Zonca. Leonardo da Vinci had sketched a similar model, but Zonca's was more complete; it is unknown if there was contact. Lombe was sent by his brother Thomas to investigate the Italian machines spinning organzine thread (raw silk warp threads used for weaving fine silk cloth). William Hutton gave an account of Lombe's time in Italy, in his History of Derby.

In 1718, Thomas Lombe was able to obtain a patent for silk throwing machinery, granted for fourteen years. John Lombe died suddenly, in 1722. According to legend, the King of Sardinia, having heard of the success of the Lombe’s undertaking, instructed a female assassin to travel to England to kill the brothers. A bas relief sculpture of John Lombe is on Derby's Exeter Bridge.

== Lombe's Mill ==
The Lombes engaged Sorocold to build a new and larger mill on the site of the old one in Derby: Lombe's Mill was completed in 1722, the year of John Lombe's death.
