= Lombe's Mill =

Historic silk throwing mill in Derby, England

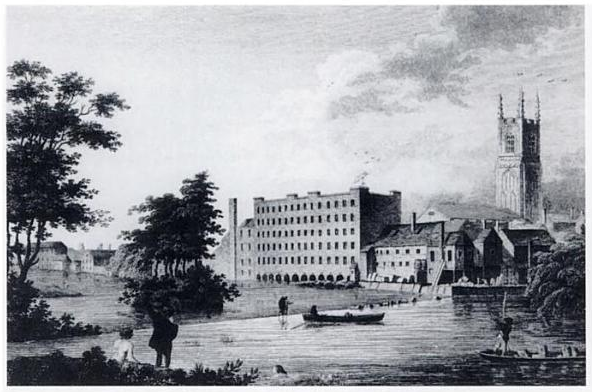
- Lombe's Mill, viewed across the River Derwent, 18th century.

- Location within Derbyshire
- Alternative names: Italian Works
- Structural system: Brick
- Owner: John Lombe
- Coordinates: 52.9256°N 1.4755°W

Construction
- Built: 1721
- Employees: 300
- Height: 17 m (56 ft)
- Other dimensions: 33.5m x 12m
- Floor count: 5

Water Power
- Diameter / width of water wheel: 7m /

Equipment
- Other Equipment: 8 Filatoio; 4 Torcitoio; winding machines in top 3 storeys

Lombe's Mill was the first successful silk throwing mill in Britain. It was built on an island on the River Derwent in Derby. It was built after John Lombe visited Piedmont in 1717 and returned to England with details of the Italian silk throwing machines – the filatoio and the torcitoio – and some Italian craftsmen. The architect was George Sorocold. At its height, the mill employed some 300 people.

== Location ==
Lombe's Mill was built next to Thomas Cotchett's 1704 mill on the west bank of the River Derwent in Derby. At this point a weir had been constructed across the river, and the mill was built on an island downstream which separated the river from the tail race of three corn mills. The tail race was also called a fleam or a leat. Derby was a key location as the river had a fast flow, and it was here that it was crossed by the London to Carlisle road

== History ==
Lombe's Mill was the first successful silk throwing mill in England and probably the first fully mechanised factory in the world. Thomas Cotchett's mill, built in Derby in 1704, was a failure. John Lombe had visited the successful silk throwing mill in Piedmont in 1716, an early example of industrial espionage. He returned to Derby with the necessary knowledge and a group of Italians. He designed the mill, and with his half-brother Thomas Lombe (born 1685) instructed George Sorocold to build it and fit it with the new machines. Between 1717 and 1721 George built the mill, beside the River Derwent to the south of Cotchett's Mill to house machines for "doubling" or twisting silk into thread.

John Lombe's idea of mill was inspired by contemporary smaller and less effective mills he studied during the period in which he worked in Italy: traditionally the spinning wheel was used for producing small quantities of silk thread at the homes of local spinsters, the new machines were capable of producing far greater quantities of silk and provided serious competition for the Italians. The machines required large buildings and a power source. An undershot water wheel turned by the mill fleam on the west side of the new mill drove the spinning machines.

Thomas Lombe was given a 14-year patent to protect the design of the throwing machines. The King of Sardinia reacted badly to the commercial challenge, placing an embargo on the export of raw silk. It is speculated that he was responsible for John Lombe's mysterious death, six years later, in 1722, perhaps poisoned by an Italian assassin paid by his Italian commercial opponents. John's elder brother, Sir Thomas Lombe, took over the business. Thomas died on 2 June 1739, leaving his estate to his widow and their two daughters.

When the patents lapsed in 1732, other mills were built in Stockport and Macclesfield. An unpowered doubling shop was built to the north of the powered Italian works some time before 1739. The mill was sold to Thomas Wilson in 1739. An inventory was taken of the doubling shop, which still exists.

Dame Elizabeth advertised the lease for sale in 1739, and the remaining 64 years of the lease were assigned to Richard Wilson junior of Leeds for £2,800. Wilson remained in Leeds leaving the running of the mill to his partners, William and Samuel Lloyd, both London merchants, with Thomas Bennet as manager, taking a proportion of the profits.

=== Italian works ===
A description of the mill, dating from between 1739 and 1753, says: "The original Italian works of five storeys high housed 26 Italian winding engines that spun the raw silk on each of the upper three floors whilst the lower two storeys contained eight spinning mills producing basic thread and four twist mills." Little of the original mill remains. It was built of brick, in flemish bond, and was 33.5m long and 12m wide. It was built on a series of stone arches that allowed the waters of the River Derwent to flow through. The mill was 17m high, topped by a shallow pitched roof. The throwing machines were two storeys high and pierced the first floor. The winding machines were situated on the top three floors. All the machines were powered by Sorocold's 7 metres diameter, 2-metre wide external undershot waterwheel. Its axle entered the mill through a navel hole at first floor level. It drove a 0.45-metre square vertical shaft that drove a line shaft that ran the length of the mill. The torcitoios and filatoios took their power from the shaft. The vertical shaft was extended beyond the second floor by an iron gudgeon to another vertical shaft that reached the top 3 floors to drive the winding machines. The mill was heated to process the silk, and this was explained in the 1718 patent. It was reported that Lombe used a fire engine (steam engine) to pump hot air round the mill in 1732. The stair column was 19.5m high. Its layout is not known, and there is no information on how bales were hoisted between the floors.

The circular spinning machines (also known as 'throwing machines'), were the most significant innovation of the factory. Together with the single source of power (water), and the large size and organisation of the workforce for the period (200–400, according to contemporary sources), the total process of production from raw silk to fine quality thread has led the Lombes' silk mill to be described as the first successful use of the factory system in Britain.

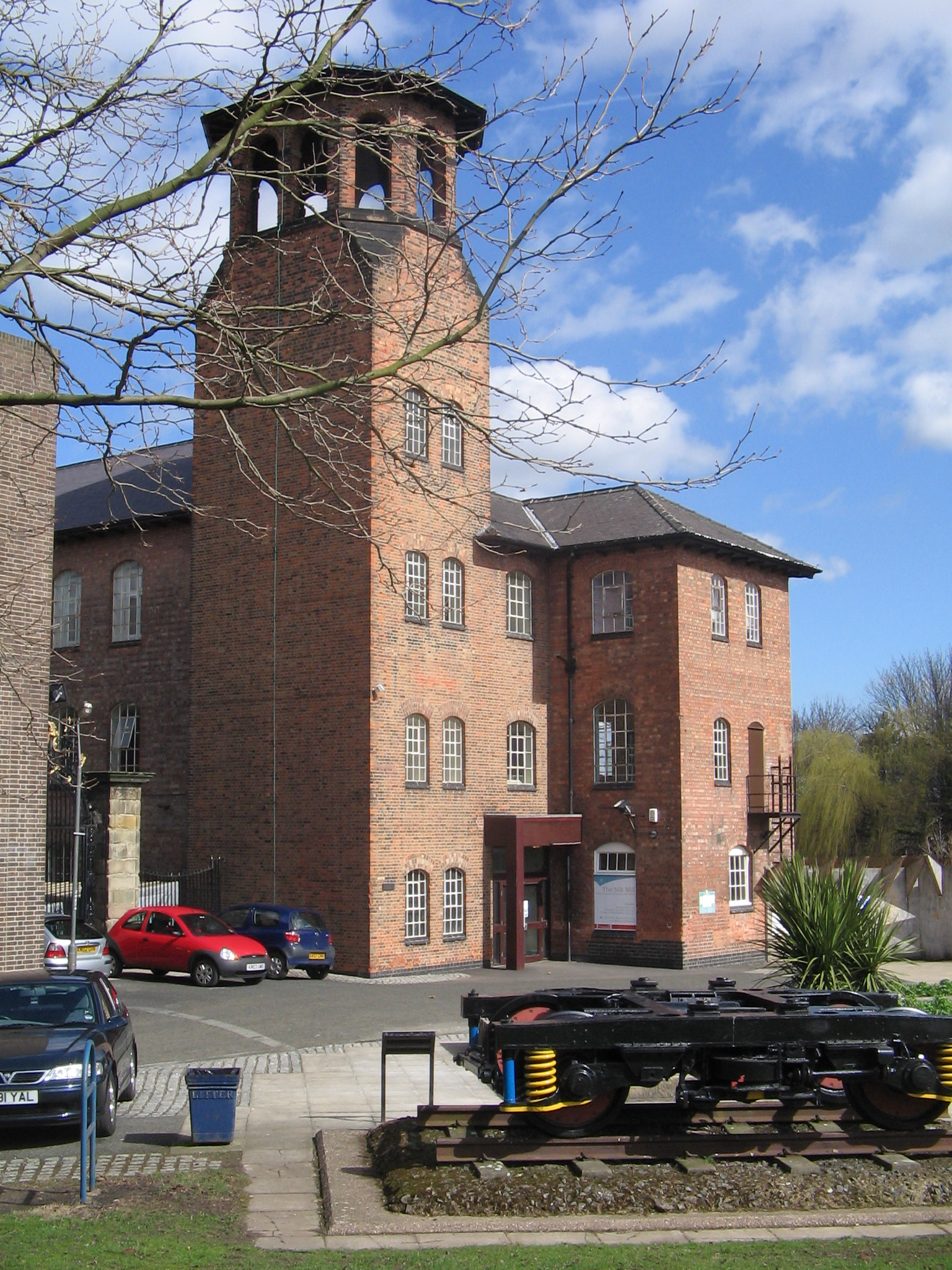
The museum entrance and tower from Cathedral Green

William Hutton was an employee and he later recalled the long hours, low wages and beatings. Work only stopped in time of drought, extreme frost or problems with the silk supply, although unofficial holidays were taken during elections and Derby races in August 1748.

The partnership of Wilson and Lloyd ended in 1753 after acrimony and legal suits. Lloyd remained in possession of the building and machinery. In 1765 Thomas Bennet bought the premises from Lloyd subject to a mortgage to the Wilson family but neglected the building during years of trade recession and competition from other mills in Derby and Cheshire. Lamech Swift became the sub-tenant in 1780 paying an annual rent of £7 to the corporation and £170 to Thomas Wilson, brother of Richard and William. Despite a row with the corporation over repairs to the weirs in 1781, he remained in occupation until the lease expired in 1803 when the corporation advertised a lease to run for 60 years. The advertisement reveals that the "Italian works" was still used for throwing silk.

=== Historic tourism ===
The Silk Mill was a tourist attraction in Derby and was visited by Boswell in September 1777. Not all the visitors were impressed by conditions. Torrington commented on the "heat, stinks and noise", whilst Fairholt in 1835 was appalled by the sickly appearance of the poor children. Foreign visitors also included the mill in their itinerary.

=== 19th century ===
November 1833 saw the beginning of industrial unrest in Derby which led to the formation of the Grand National Trades Union in February 1834. It predated the Tolpuddle Martyrs by several months. Taylor's Silk Mill was not at the centre of the controversy although he was one of the employers who agreed not to employ any worker who was a union member. By the middle of April 1834 Taylor reported that two-thirds of his machinery was working and many of his former workers were applying for reinstatement. According to "The Derby Mercury" some of the former unionists were never able to find fresh employment in Derby. This event is commemorated by a march organised by the Derby Trades Union Council annually on the weekend before MayDay. The story of the Derby Lock-out was dramatised as a short film sponsored by Unite the union in 2015. This was first screened at Derby Quad cinema on 25 April 2015

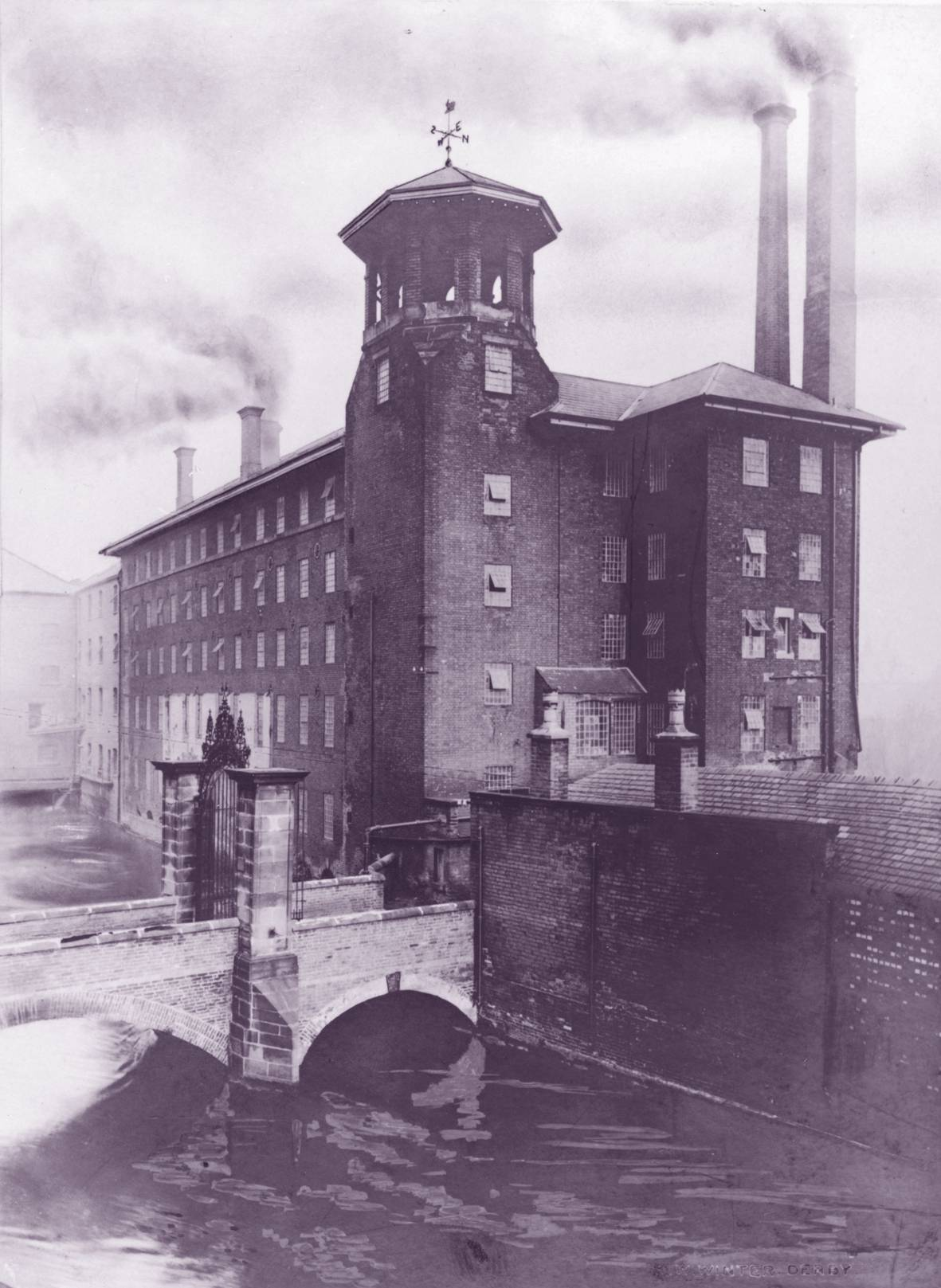
Derby Silk Mill, probably in the early 1900s, before the 1910 fire.

The Taylor family remained in occupation of the mill until 1865 when bankruptcy forced them to sell the machinery and lease. "The Derby Mercury" advertised several silk mills for sale that year when a general slump hit the industry. This took place four years before the Cobden Treaty with France which is said to have effectively destroyed the British silk industry.

=== 20th century ===
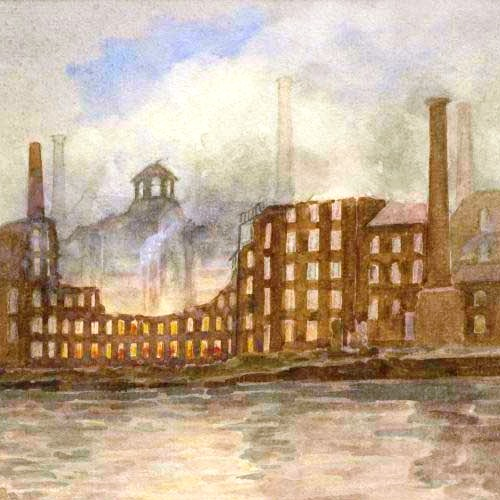
Watercolour by Alfred John Keene of the 1910 fire.

The connection with silk production ended in about 1908 when F.W. Hampshire and Company, the chemists, moved into the premises to make fly papers and cough medicines. On 5 December 1910 at 5.00 am, fire broke out in the adjacent Sowter Brothers flour mill and engulfed the Silk Mill. The mill's east wall fell into the river and the building was gutted. Great efforts were made by the borough fire brigade and the Midland Railway Company who saved the shell of the tower and the outline of the doorways leading into the original five floors. These can be seen today on the tower staircase. The building was rebuilt to the same height but with three storeys instead of five and remains that way today.

During the 1920s, ownership passed to the Electricity Authority. It was used as stores, workshops and a canteen. Hidden from the road by the power station, its existence was forgotten by the public until the power station was demolished in 1970. It was then adapted for use as Derby's Industrial Museum, which opened on 29 November 1974.

== Doubling shop ==
The main range was three storeys high, 42.4m by 5.5m. Each floor was used for doubling, and there were 306 doubling machines.

== The silk throwing process ==
Silk is a naturally produced fibre obtained from many species of the silk moth. In 1700 the favoured silk was produced by a moth (Bombyx mori), that spun a cocoon to protect the larvae. The larvae fed on mulberry leaves grown in Italy. Silk fibres from the Bombyx mori silkworm have a triangular cross section with rounded corners, 5–10 μm wide. The silk is a protein, fibroin, that was cemented in place by the use of gum, another protein, sericin. The cocoons were harvested and placed in troughs of hot water to dissolve the gum and allowed the single thread to be wound into a skein. The skeins were placed into bales and taken to the mill for processing. Three sorts of yarn could be produced: no-twist which was suitable for weft, tram that had received a slight twist making it easier to handle, and organzine which had a greater twist and was suitable for use as warp. Reeling is the industrial process where silk that has been wound into skeins, is cleaned, receives a twist and is wound onto bobbins. Silk throwing is the process where the thread from the bobbins is twisted again to form tram and or organzine. The yarn is twisted together into threads, in a process known as doubling. Colloquially silk throwing can be used to refer to the whole process: reeling, throwing and doubling.

In 1700, Italians were the most technologically advanced throwsters in Europe and had developed two machines capable of winding the silk onto bobbins while putting a twist in the thread. They called the throwing machine, a filatoio, and the doubler, a torcitoio. There is an illustration of a circular handpowered throwing machine drawn in 1487 with 32 spindles. The first evidence of an externally powered filatoio comes from the thirteenth century, and the earliest illustration from around 1500. Filatorios and torcitoios contained parallel circular frames that revolved round each other on a central axis. The speed of the relative rotation determined the twist. Silk would only co-operate in the process if the temperature and humidity were high, in Italy the temperature was elevated by sunlight but in Derby the mill had to be heated, and the heat evenly distributed.

== Today ==
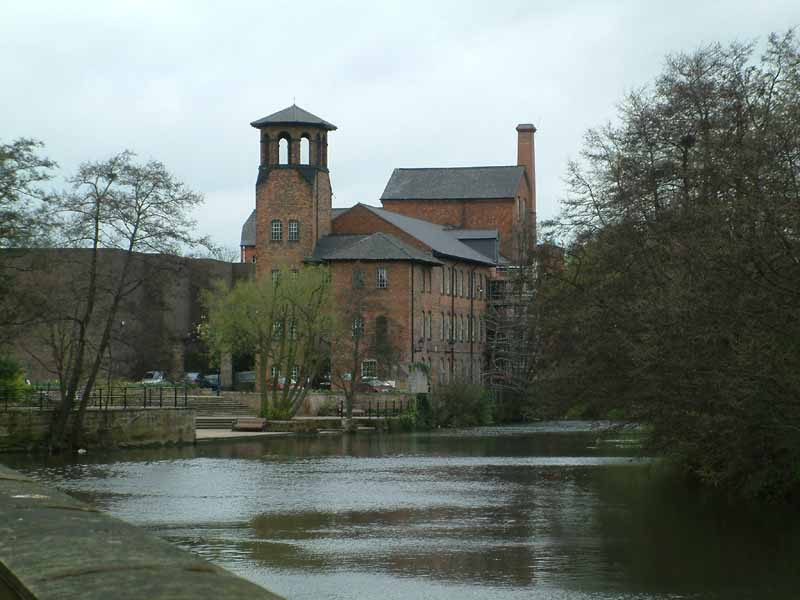
The Derby Silk Mill built on the foundations of Lombe's Mill.

The mill passed through several owners and has been rebuilt several times, but the modified structure is extant and has been restored to house the Derby Silk Mill, a museum of industry and history. There is a Bas relief sculpture of John Lombe at the nearby Exeter Bridge.

== See also ==
- Silk
- Textile manufacture during the Industrial Revolution

== Bibliography ==
- Calladine, Anthony (1993). "Lombe's Mill: An Exercise in reconstruction". Industrial Archaeology Review. XVI (1). Maney Publishing. ISSN 0309-0728.
- Darley, Gillian (2003). Factory (Objekt). London: Reaktion Books. ISBN 1-86189-155-5.
- Rayner, Hollins (1903). Silk throwing and waste silk spinning. Scott, Greenwood, Van Nostrand. OL 7174062M.
- Warner, Frank (1921). "18". The silk industry of the United Kingdom. Its origin and development. London: Dranes. pp. 198–211. OCLC 2303073.
