= Derby Silk Mill =

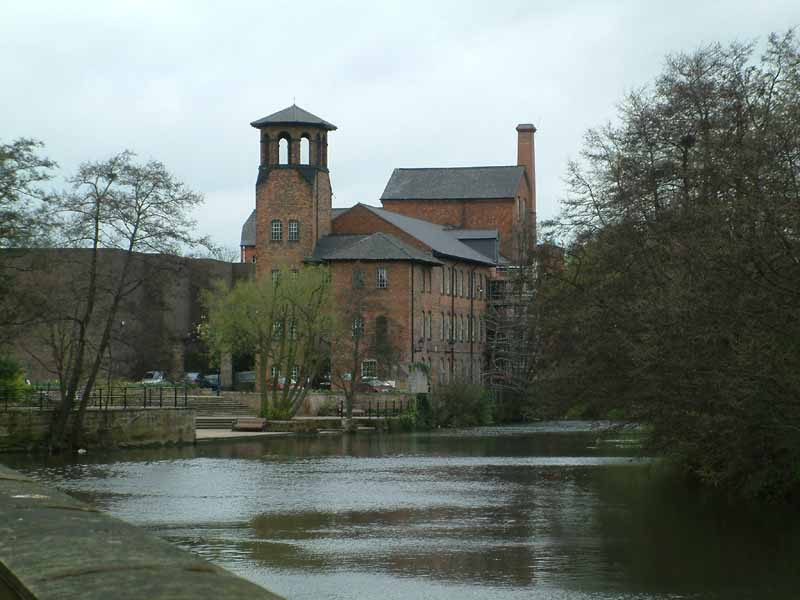
- The museum and the River Derwent

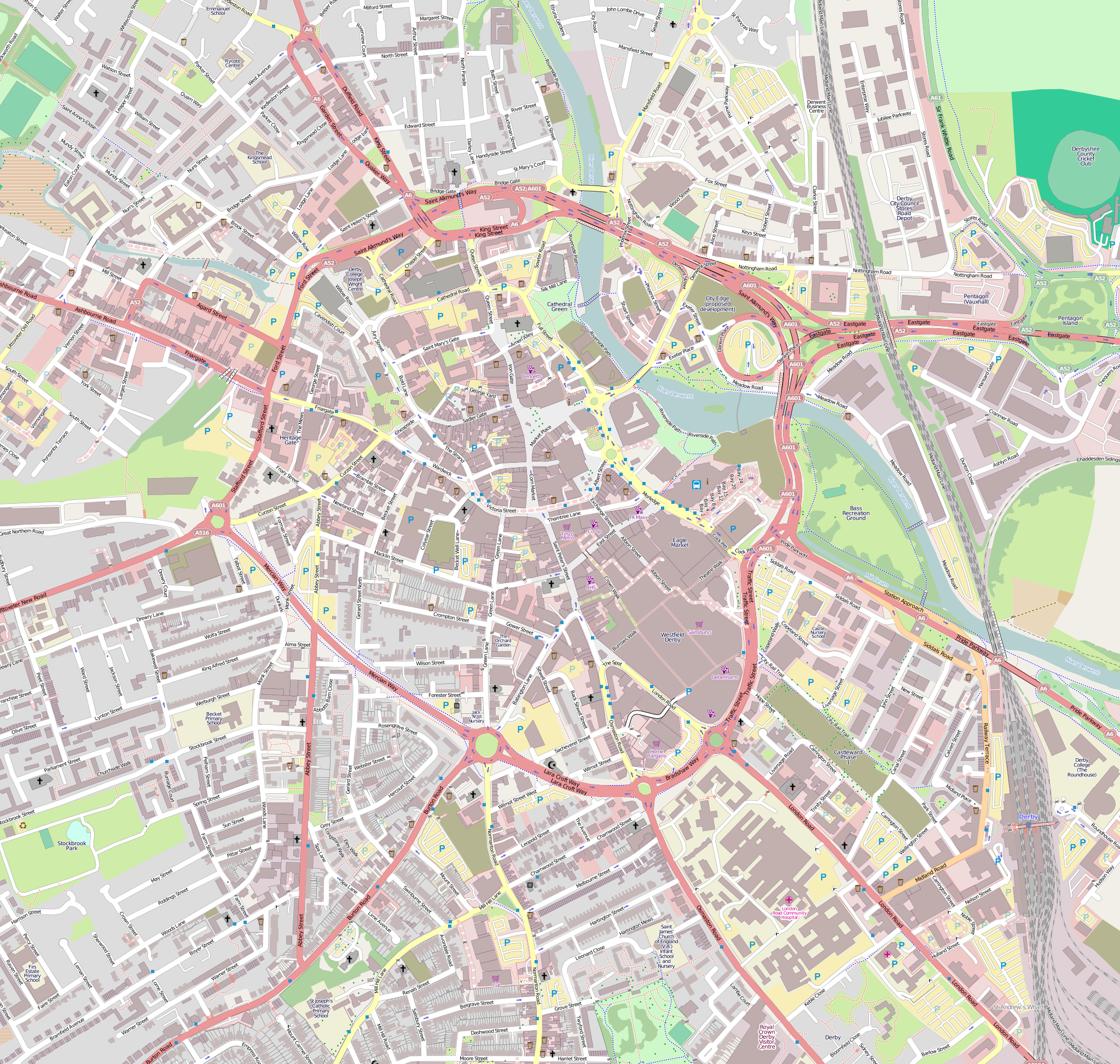
- Location within central Derby
- Established: 1974
- Location: Derby, England
- Coordinates: 52.925833°N 1.475833°W
- Type: Industrial museum
- Website: https://www.derbymuseums.org/museum-of-making/

Derby Silk Mill, formerly known as Derby Industrial Museum, is a museum of industry and history in Derby, England. The museum is located on the former site of Lombe's Mill, a historic silk mill which marks the southern end of the Derwent Valley Mills World Heritage Site. The site opened as Derby’s Industrial Museum, on 29 November 1974. A £17 million redevelopment scheme started in 2016, and the museum reopened under the new name of the Museum of Making on 21 May 2021.

== History ==
The site was adapted for use as Derby’s Industrial Museum, which opened on 29 November 1974. Derby City Council temporarily closed the museum on 3 April 2015 to free funds for the redevelopment of the Silk Mill museum and other museums in the city. The Report of the Strategic Director of Neighbourhoods (Item 7 put before the Council Cabinet meeting held on 26 October 2010) indicated that this would result in the loss of 8.6 full-time jobs but would release £197,000 a year to mitigate the loss of "Renaissance Programme" funding. No date for re-opening was given in the report, although a period of two years was reported.

== Museum of Making ==
In October 2016, a £17 million redevelopment programme started to reinvent and redevelop the museum for the 21st century, incorporating the principles of Science, Technology, Engineering, Art, and Mathematics (STEAM).

The redevelopment involved an innovative integrated project insurance (IPI) procurement model which aimed to eliminate the common blame/claim culture within construction projects by creating a shared-risk, alliance-based contract governing all project team members. The alliance members delivered the project on time and to budget, despite the COVID-19 pandemic and suppliers going into administration.

The museum reopened on 21 May 2021 under the new name of the Museum of Making.

In its first year of opening the new Museum of Making received a 'Highly Commended' placement in the annual Museum+Heritage Awards within the category 'Sustainable Project of the Year'. In September 2021 it also won the National Construction News Awards on the category 'Project of the Year Under £25m', as well as five further awards in the Constructing Excellence East Midlands Awards. On 10 May 2022 it was announced that the Museum of Making was short-listed for the 2022 Art Fund Museum of the Year award.

The museum exhibits are largely on the upper floors to reduce the amount of damage that would be done in the case of flooding such as that which occurred in October 2023 due to Storm Babet. Damage caused by the storm led to the closure of the museum until 25 January 2024. In August 2025 the museum applied for planning permission to fit its workshop area with flood protection.

== See also ==
- Listed buildings in Derby (Arboretum Ward)

== Further reading and sources of information ==
- H. E. Butterton (1997), Struck out! Derby in Crisis: the Silk Mill Lock-Out 1833-4, Derby
- Derby Evening Telegraph and Derby Library Service (1999), Derby Industrial Museum
- Bill Whitehead (2001), The Derby Lock-Out and the origins of the labour movement
