= George Sorocold =

English civil engineer (c. 1668–1738)

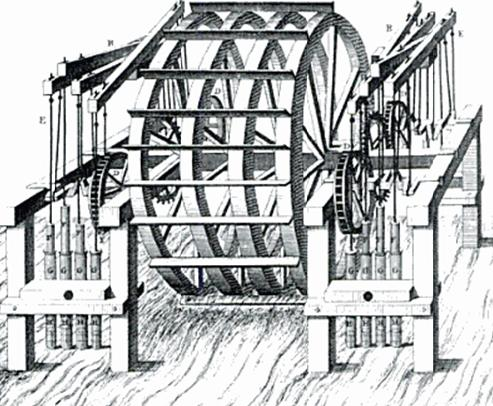
Sorocold's water wheel on the River Thames

George Sorocold (c. 1668 – c. 1738) was an English civil engineer notable for pioneering work on water supplies and hydraulic power systems around Great Britain.

== Biography ==
Sorocold was born in Lancashire in 1666, the son of James Sorocold and Elizabeth Barrow. He obtained a degree at Cambridge and immediately started his first job in Derby. He married Mary, the daughter of Henry Franceys, on 7 December 1684; by 1702 they had thirteen children, of whom eight survived.

Some time between 1685 and 1687 Sorocold was involved with the water supply to Macclesfield and in 1687, he took on the job of rehanging the bells in All Saints Church, now Derby Cathedral.

In 1692, he constructed the town's first waterworks, using a waterwheel to pump through some four miles of pipe made of elm trunks. For these he developed a boring machine, which he later patented. This waterworks lasted nearly a hundred years, and he constructed others around the country, at Alloa (1711–12), Bridgnorth, Bristol, Deal, King's Lynn, Leeds, Newcastle upon Tyne, Norwich, Portsmouth, Sheffield, and Great Yarmouth. In London he built Marchants Water Works, rebuilt London Bridge Water Works and carried out improvements to the New River. Among his many innovations were pumps worked by water‑wheels which rose and fell in accordance with the level of the stream. A patent was granted to his colleague, John Hadley, in 1693.

In 1695 and 1699, he produced plans for improving navigation of both the Yorkshire and Derbyshire River Derwents. He was also involved in improvements to the Rivers Lea, Aire and Cam.

He built the first silk mill in Derby to the instruction of Thomas Cotchett, who had worked with the silk weavers of Spitalfields in London, and realised the benefit of applying power to the spinning process. He copied machines that were already in use by the Dutch spinners. Perhaps because they were less efficient than the Italian ones, or perhaps for business reasons, the project failed.

The idea was taken up by John Lombe who, with his brother Thomas, engaged Sorocold to build a new, larger mill, based on the Italian pattern, on the site of the old one, completed in 1722. For Sorocold, who had previously been engaged with pumps and water wheels, this was something of a challenge. The machinery when finished contained 10,000 spindles, with 25,000 spinning reel bobbins, nearly 5000 star wheels, over 9000 twist bobbins and 46,000 winding bobbins, all to be driven by a single water wheel. Lombe's Mill, extensively reconstructed after a fire in 1910, is now the Derby Industrial Museum.

It was very nearly the death of him. One day, while escorting a group of visitors to the mill, Sorocold missed his footing on the walkway and fell into the sluice. The force of the water carried him into the wheel between two of the paddles, one of which gave way, ejecting him into the mill-tail.

He also improved the drainage systems for mines, built iron forges and atmospheric engines. He also advised on dock engineering, possibly Howlands Dock in Surrey and certainly the Old Dock built by Thomas Steers in Liverpool.

Sorocold achieved national fame, and could be considered Britain's first civil engineer. He was called the Great English Engineer by two of his contemporaries, and was the first non-military person to be styled "engineer." His date of death is uncertain, but believed to be some time after 1738.
