= Silk throwing =

Textile industry process

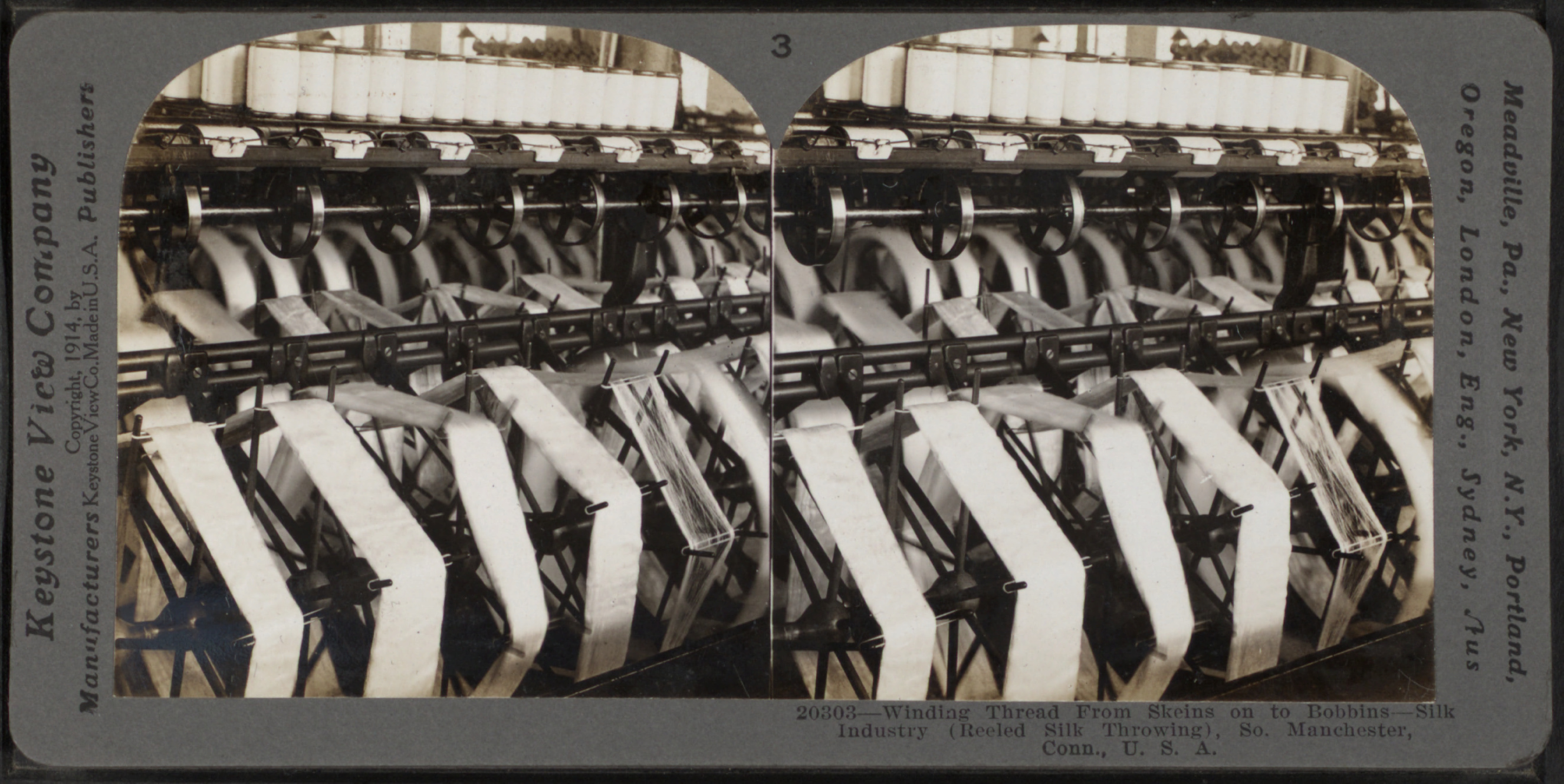
Silk industry (reeled silk throwing) Winding thread from skeins on to bobbins.

Silk throwing is the industrial process wherein silk that has been reeled into skeins, is cleaned, receives a twist and is wound onto bobbins. The yarn is now twisted together with threads, in a process known as doubling. Colloquially silk throwing can be used to refer to the whole process: reeling, throwing and doubling. Silk had to be thrown to make it strong enough to be used as organzine for the warp in a loom, or tram for weft.

== History ==
Silk weaving is known to have been carried out in Sicily in the tenth century, and in 1474 there were 15,000 employed in the industry in Milan. There is an illustration of a circular hand-powered throwing machine drawn in 1487 with 32 spindles. The Italians called the throwing machine a filatoio and the doubler a torcitoio. The first evidence of an externally powered filatoio comes from the thirteenth century, and the earliest illustration from around 1500. Bologna became the most technologically advanced silk-throwing town, with filatoio driven by overhead shafts that were powered by water.

In 1704, Thomas Cotchett set up a water-powered silk-throwing mill to produce organzine in Derby. It failed due to the use of the wrong type of machinery. In 1717, John Lombe visited Piedmont and returned to England with details of the Italian machines and some Italian craftsmen. He was granted a fourteen-year patent and built Lombe's Mill in Derby. The King of Sardinia retaliated by prohibiting the export of raw silk. Nevertheless, in 1732 John Guardivaglio set up a silk-throwing enterprise at Logwood mill in Stockport; in 1744, The Button Mill was erected in Macclesfield and in 1753 Old Mill was built in Congleton. These three towns remained the centre of the English silk-throwing industry.

=== The silk-throwing process ===
The skeins were placed into bales and taken to the mill for processing. Three sorts of yarn were commonly produced: no-twist which was suitable for weft, tram that had received a slight twist making it easier to handle, and organzine which had a greater twist and was suitable for use as warp. Reeling is the process where the silk that has been wound into skeins is cleaned, receives a twist, and is wound onto bobbins. Silk throwing is the process where the filament from the bobbins is given its full twist. The process where filaments or threads from three or more bobbins are wound together is called doubling. The last two processes can occur more than once and in any order. Tram was wound, thrown and doubled, organzine was wound, doubled then thrown and doubled again. Sewing silk could receive further doubling and throwing. No-twist was often three single filaments doubled together. Many other combinations were possible. Colloquially silk throwing can be used to refer to the whole process: reeling, throwing and doubling, and silk throwsters would speak of throwing as twisting or spinning.

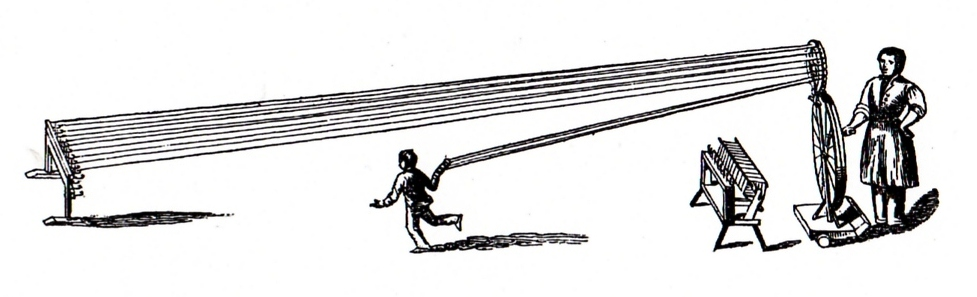
1843 Illustration

Silk throwing was originally a hand process relying on turning a wheel (the gate) that twisted four threads while a helper who would be a child, ran the length of a shade, hooked the threads on stationary pins (the cross)and ran back to start the process again. The shade would be a between 23 and 32m long. The process was described in detail to Lord Shaftesbury's Royal Commission of Inquiry into the Employment of Children in 1841:

For twisting it is necessary to have what are designated shades which are buildings of at least 30 or 35 yards in length, of two or more rooms, rented separately by one, two or four men having one gate and a boy called a helper... the upper storey is generally occupied by children, young persons or grown women as 'piecers', 'winders' and 'doublers' attending to their reels and bobbins, driven by the exertions of one man... He (the boy) takes first a rod containing four bobbins of silk from the twister who stands at his gate or wheel, and having fastened the ends, runs to the 'cross' at the extreme end of the room, round which he passes the threads of each bobbin and returns to the 'gate'. He is despatched on a second expedition of the same kind, and returns as before, he then runs up to the cross and detaches the threads and comes to the roller. Supposing the master to make twelve rolls a day, the boy necessarily runs fourteen miles, and this is barefooted.

In 1700, the Italians were the most technologically advanced throwsters in Europe and had developed two machines capable of winding the silk onto bobbins while putting a twist in the thread. They called the throwing machine, a filatoio and the doubler a torcitoio. There is an illustration of a circular hand-powered throwing machine drawn in 1487 with 32 spindles. The first evidence of an externally powered filatoio comes from the thirteenth century, and the earliest illustration from around 1500. Filatorios and torcitoios contained parallel circular frames that revolved round each other on a central axis. The speed of the relative rotation determined the twist. Silk would only cooperate in the process if the temperature and humidity were high. In Italy the temperature was elevated by sunlight, but in Derby the mill had to be heated and the heat evenly distributed.

In East Cheshire only two mills are known with certainty to have been built to house Italian-style circular throwing machines; they are the Old Mill at Congleton and the Button Mill, Macclesfield.

By 1820, throwing was done using rectangular frames, manufactured from cast iron, and powered by belts from line shafts.

1834 machines

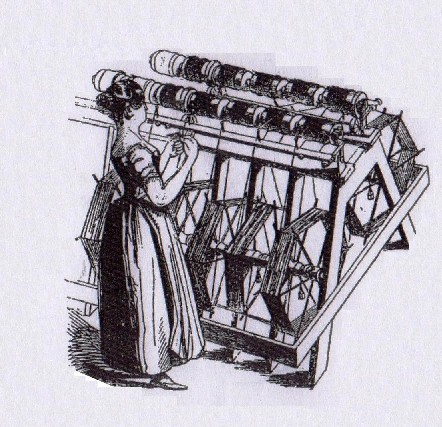
A winding machine

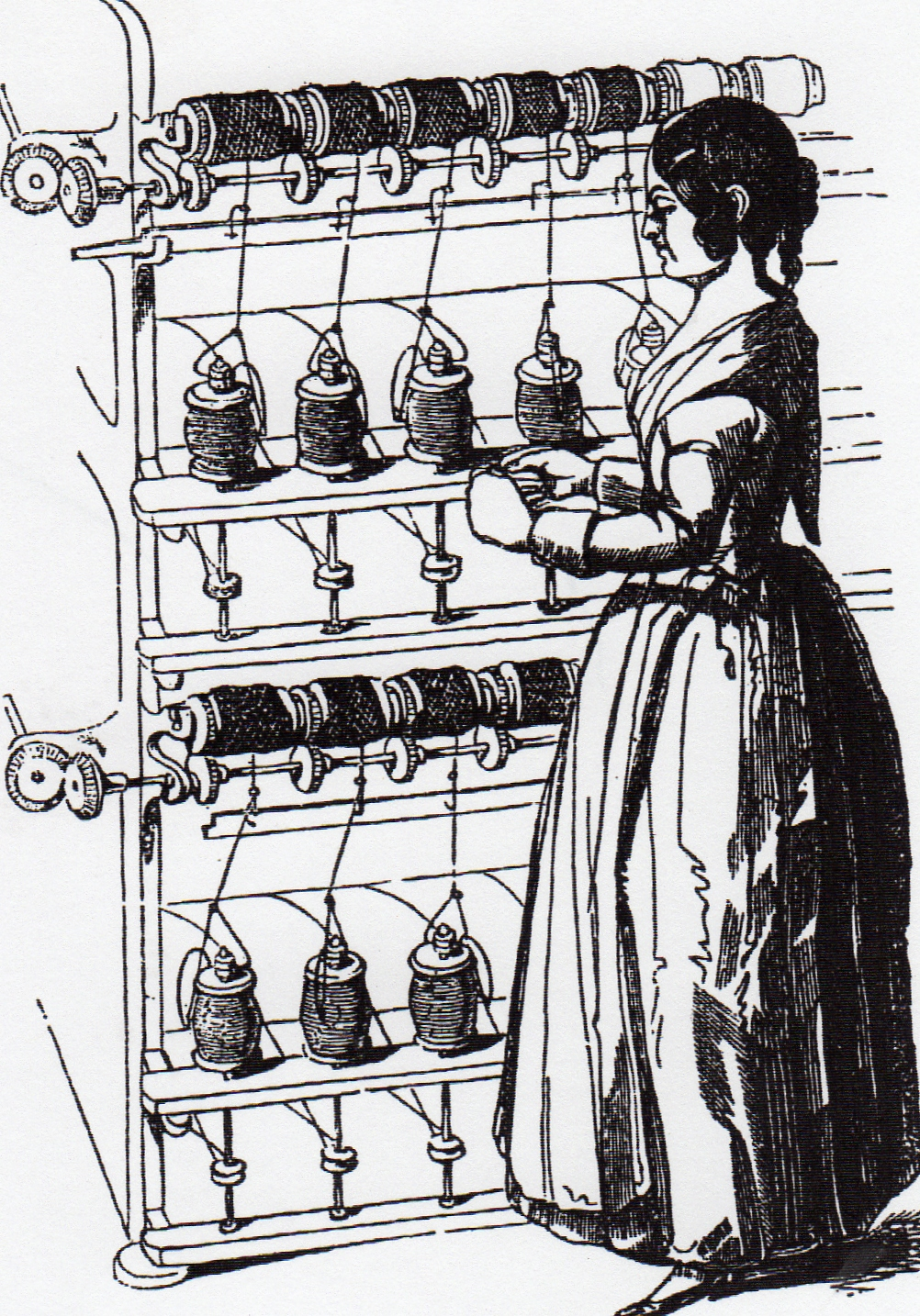
A throwing machine

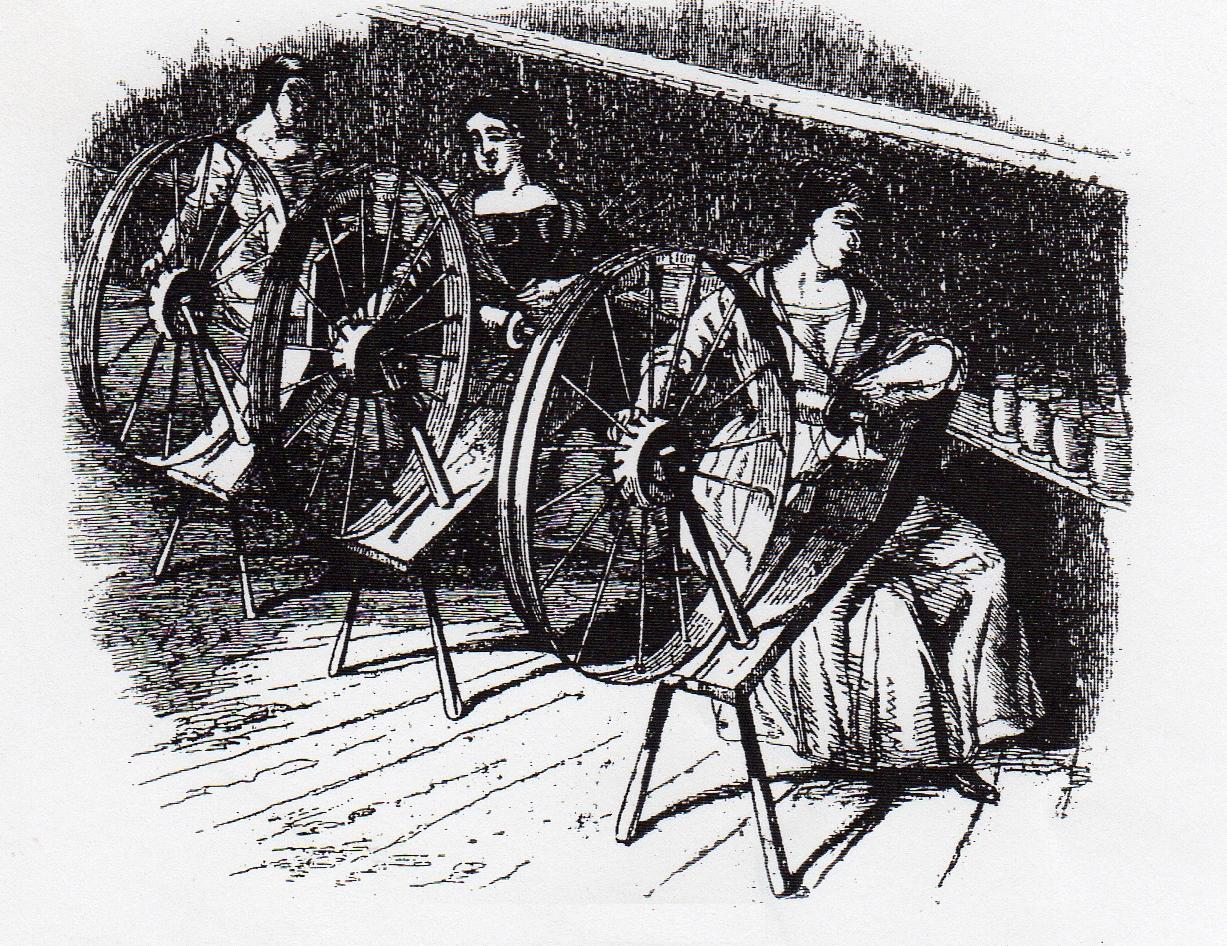
Doubling by hand
