= Steffturbine =

The Steffturbine is a turbine for generating electrical energy using hydropower. Their functioning and performance was proven by the scientific investigations of Ivo Baselt within the framework of his dissertation.

The Steffturbine is suitable for the use in micro or small hydro-electric power stations and can be operated as a modular system. Modules can be deployed with heads of between 3 and 5 meters and maximum flow rates of 0.5 m^{3}/s to generate up to 10 kW of electric power. The Steffturbine has been developed by Walter Reist Holding AG and is marketed as a complete system with generator and control electronics included.

== Function ==
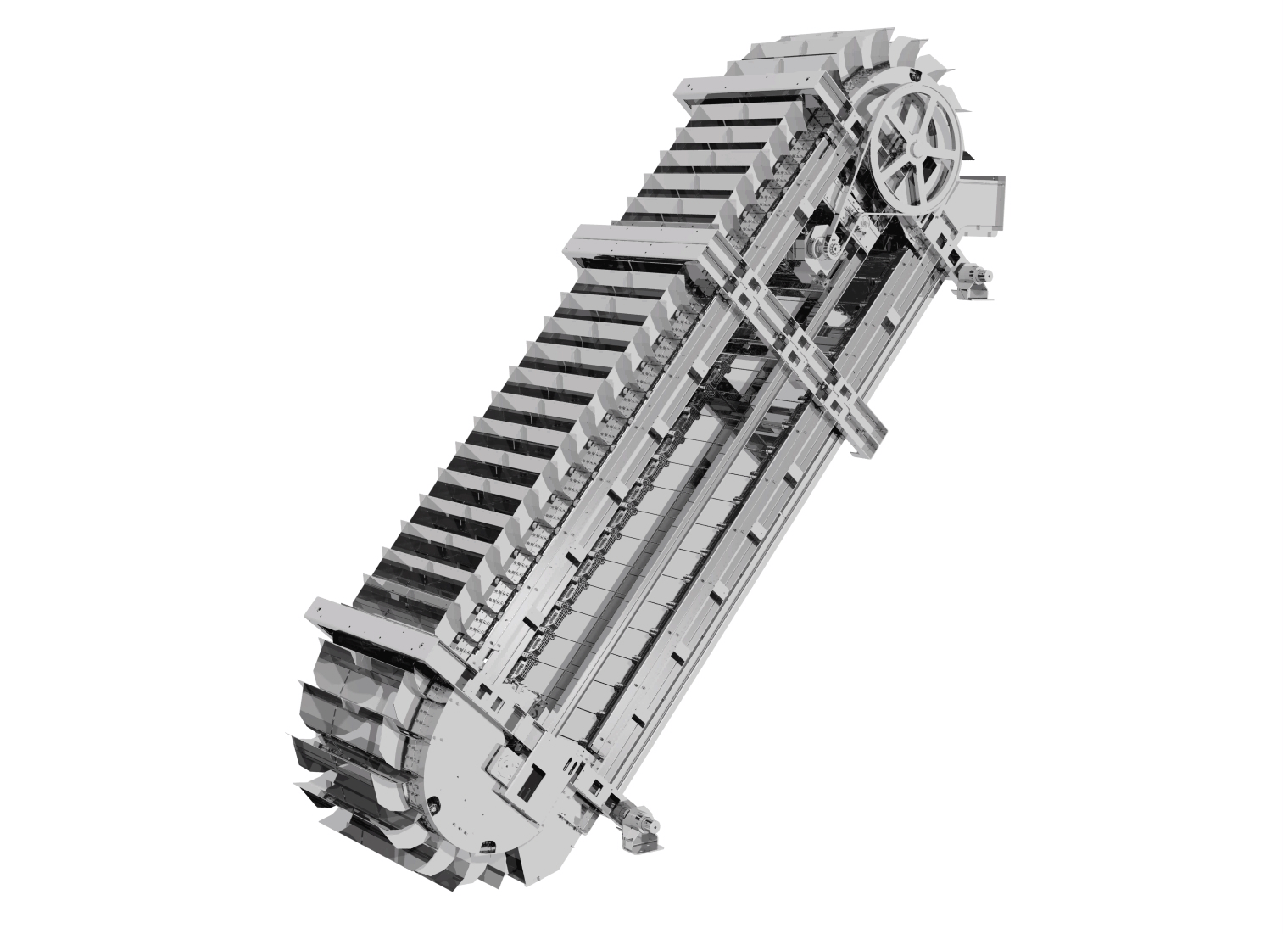
Drawing of the Steffturbine

The Steffturbine is driven by the potential energy of the water, it operates like an overshot water wheel. It comprises a conveyor chain equipped with profiled paddles circulating around two wheels. These wheels are arranged so that the flowing water drives the conveyor chain on an inclined plane. Different turbine inclinations are possible.

Water is fed to the Steffturbine through an inlet channel. The inflow of water loads the paddles. The power thus exerted onto the paddles causes the chain, which is mounted to run on roller bearings, to move. In turn, the circulating chain imparts a rotational motion to the drive wheels. A generator is connected to the rotating drive wheels via an overdrive transmission. The generator converts the rotational mechanical power into an electrical output. The resultant electrical power is modulated by means of the electronic control system and adapted to the different operating modes.

== Applications ==
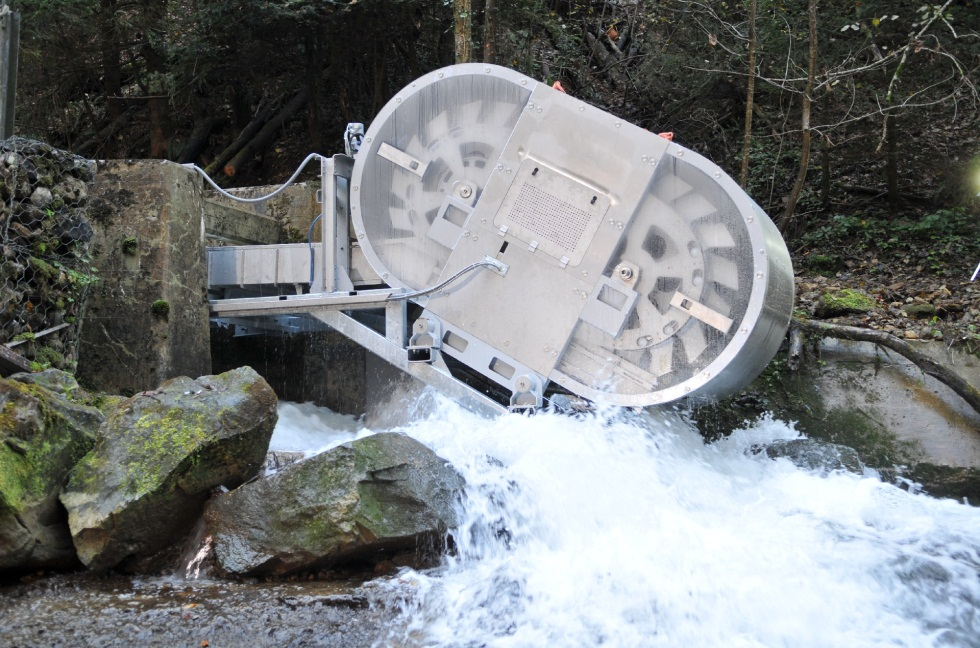
Installed Steffturbine near Rüti, Switzerland

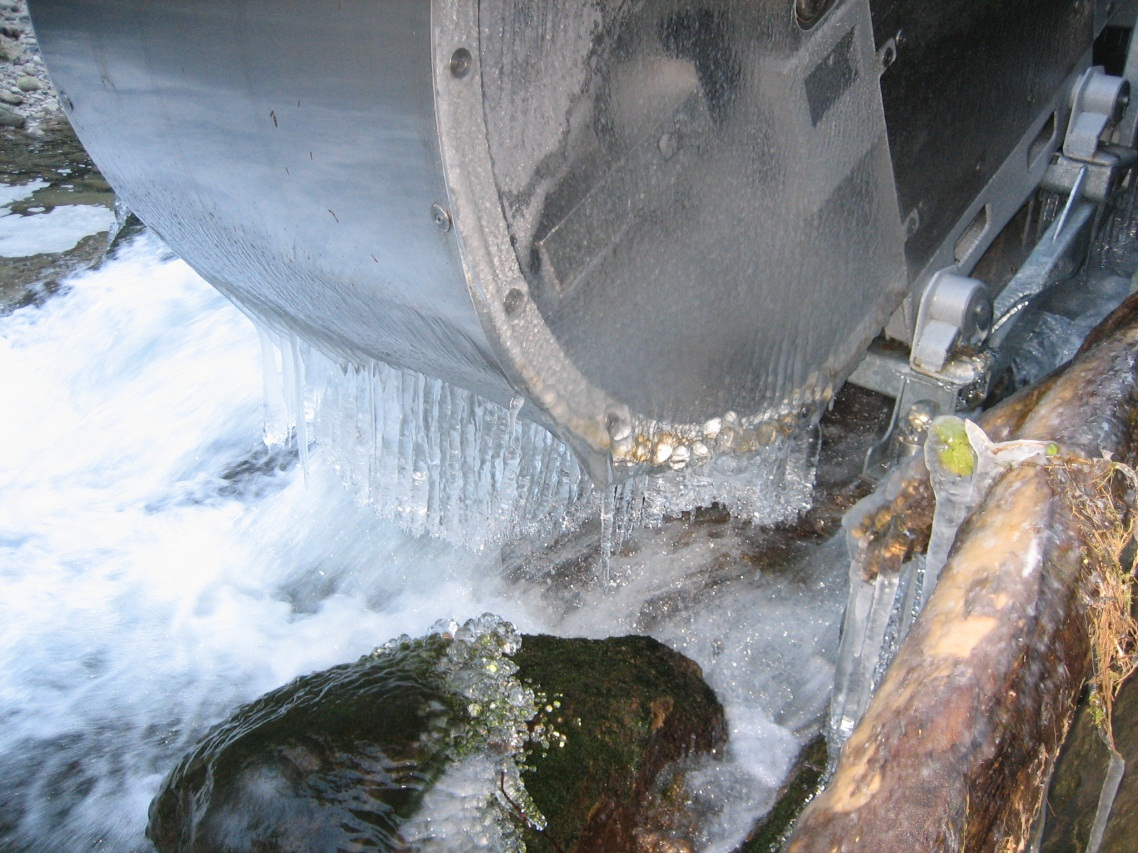
Steffturbine during the winter time near Rüti, Switzerland

The Steffturbine can be employed for grid supply in isolated or stand-alone operation or as part of a combined network solution. The mechanical design is the same for all operating modes, and only the output electronics require fitting with different components. The Steffturbine can be deployed in any location where water flows down a gradient, for example rivers, dams, treatment plants, or existing weirs set for revitalization, with the inclination and length of the Steffturbine being adjusted to the local conditions. In the simplest case, the Steffturbine can also be laid on the surface, for the water to flow through it. As a result, the river-course ecosystem remains largely unaffected.

== Efficiency ==
The turbine is at its most efficient at inclinations between 30° and 60°. Its efficiency during the individual development phases was tested under laboratory conditions. For the first prototype, a maximum of 86% was achieved. Implementation of optimization options derived from the tests resulted in an improvement of turbine efficiency to 92%.
