= Stadio Marcantonio Bentegodi =

Building in Verona, Italy

Coordinates: 45°26′7″N 10°58′7″E

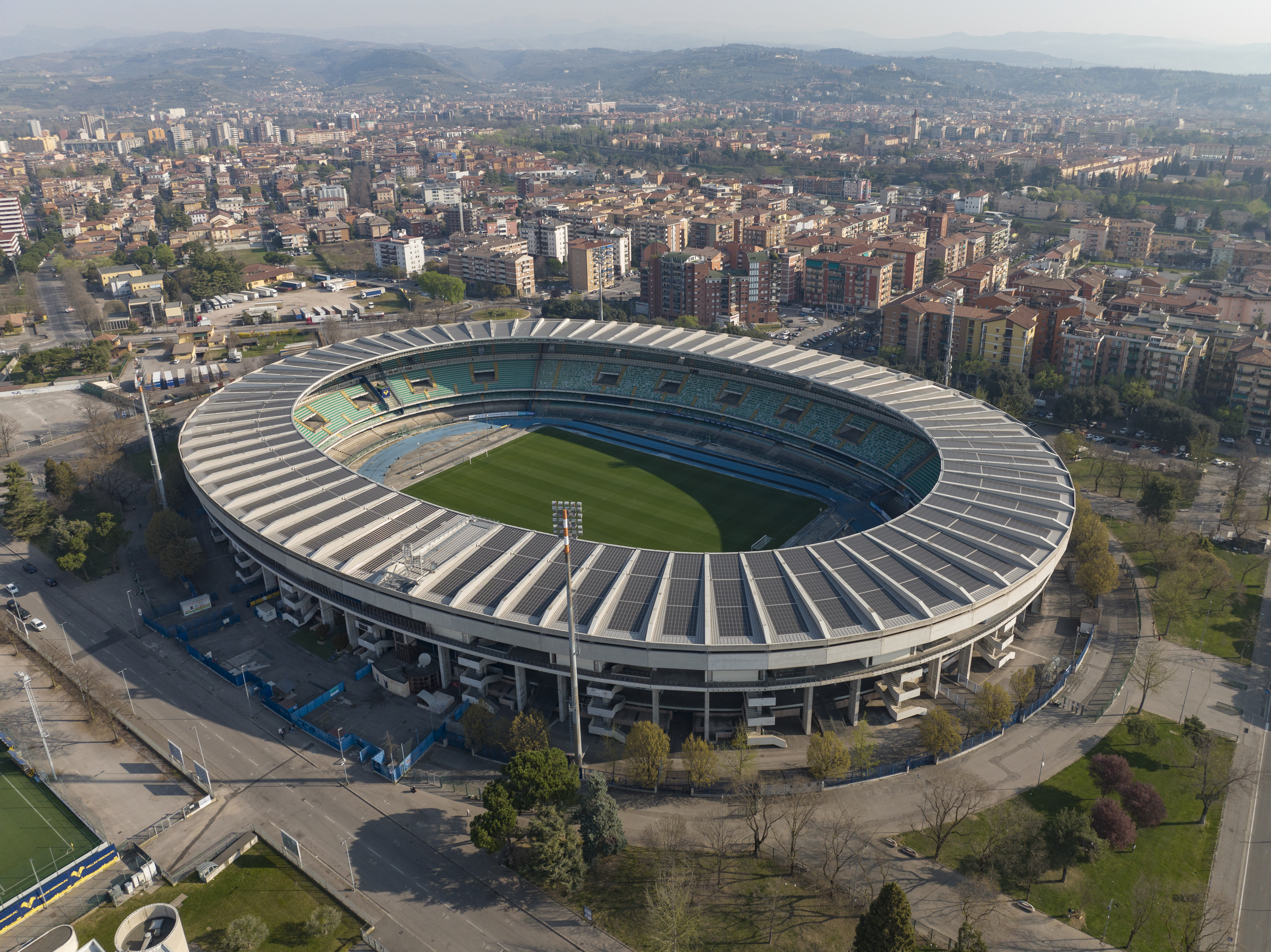
- Interactive map of Stadio Marcantonio Bentegodi
- Location: Verona, Italy
- Owner: Municipality of Verona
- Capacity: 39,211
- Surface: Grass; 105 x 67 m
- Scoreboard: Megavision

Construction
- Opened: 15 December 1963
- Renovated: 1989

Tenants
- Hellas Verona (1963–present); ChievoVerona (1986–2021); Italy national football team (selected matches)

The Stadio Marcantonio Bentegodi is a stadium in Verona, Italy. It is the home of Hellas Verona of Serie A and was also the home of Chievo Verona, a former football club, until 2021. It also hosts matches of women's team Bardolino Verona, some youth team matches, rugby matches, athletics events and occasionally even musical concerts. With 39,211 total seats, of which only 31,713 are approved, it is the eighth-largest stadium in Italy by capacity. The stadium is named after the historic benefactor of Veronese sport, Marcantonio Bentegodi.

== History ==
Inaugurated as a state-of-the-art facility and as one of Italy's finest venues in 1963, the stadium appeared excessive for a team (Hellas) that had spent the best part of the previous 35 years in Serie B. For the 1990 FIFA World Cup renovations included an extra tier and a roof to cover all sections, improved visibility, public transport connections, an urban motorway connecting the city centre with the stadium and the Verona Nord motorway exit and services.

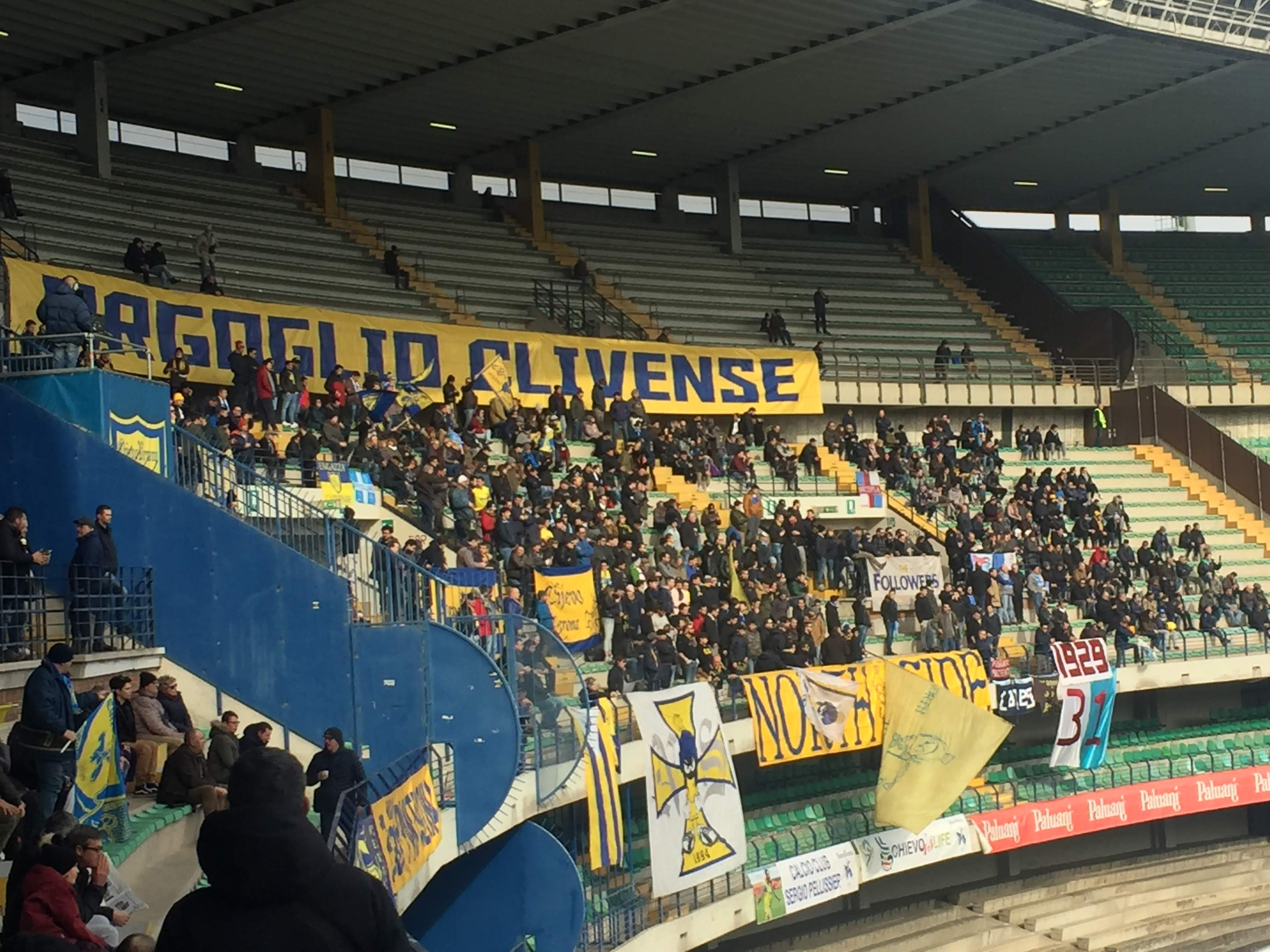
The stadium's Curva Nord in 2019, usually reserved for Chievo's fanbase.

A building-integrated PV system has been installed on the rooftop during a major renovation. The PV system has a rating of 999.5 kW. 13,321 "FS 275" thin-film cadmium telluride (CdTe) solar modules by First Solar Inc. have been mounted on the aluminum mounting system Riverclack by ISCOM SpA. The solar modules are connected to 141 Sunny Mini Central SMC 7000HV inverters by SMA Solar Technology AG. The system was commissioned at the end of November 2009.

The emergence of Chievo on the Serie A stage in the early 2000s has split the city into two groups of archrival fans, both very loyal to their respective cause.

Despite playing two divisions lower than Chievo and missing out on travelling supporters from the large Serie A teams, Hellas Verona – the city's traditionally bigger team – still maintained higher average attendances than their rival during the 2009–10 season. In the 2013–14 season, Virtus Verona also played at the Bentegodi.

== Renovation projects ==
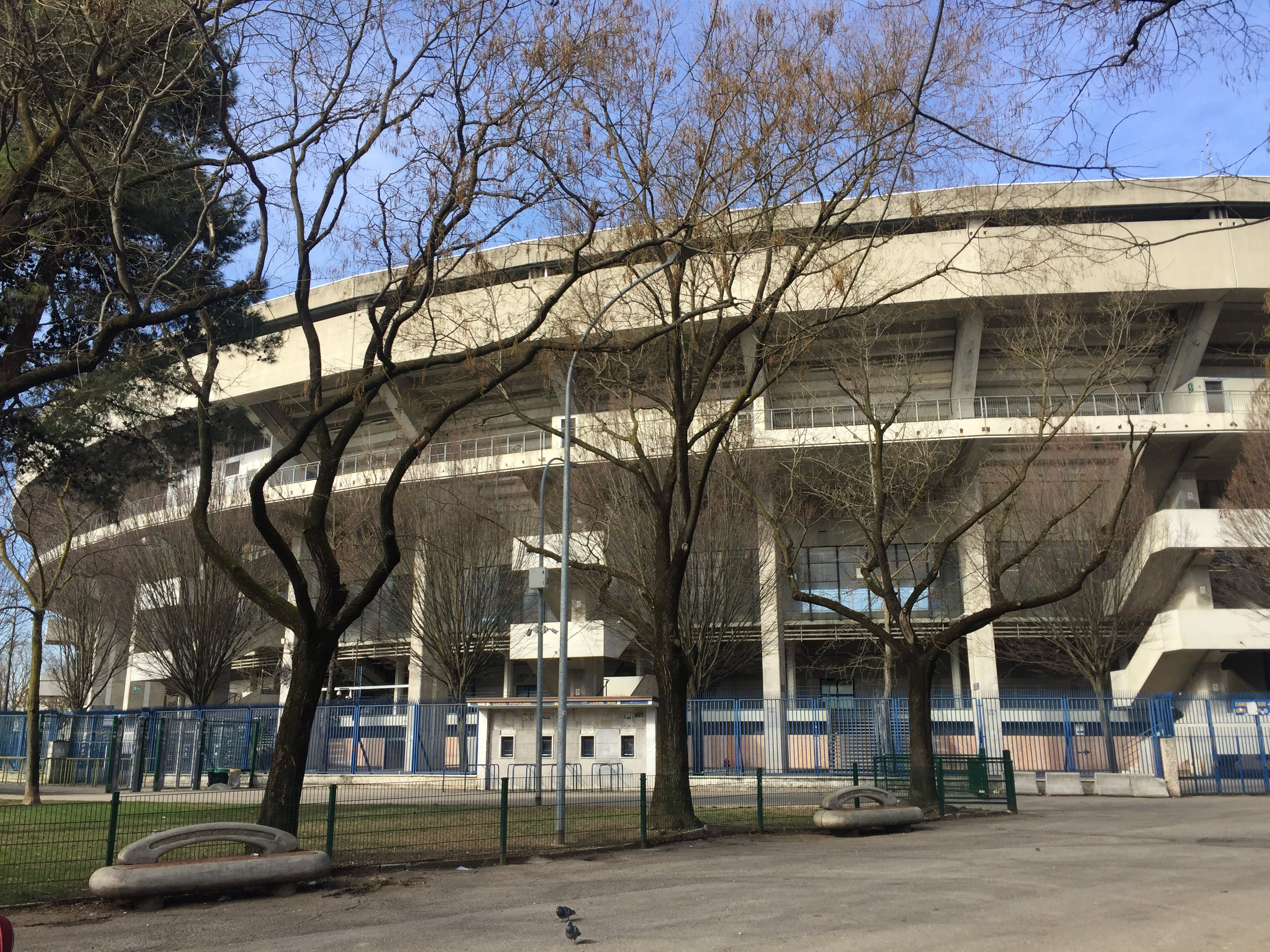
Outside view of the stadium in 2019.

The stadium is vying to participate in 2032 European Championship. The municipal administration approved the restructuring plan, with the aim of adapting the plant to the UEFA rules.

== Average attendances ==
Season	Hellas Verona	Tier	Chievo Verona	Tier
1994–95	10,015	B	4,335	B
1995–96	13,371	B	5,120	B
1996–97	20,456	A	5,156	B
1997–98	9,846	B	4,135	B
1998–99	11,376	B	3,264	B
1999–2000	18,141	A	2,680	B
2000–01	17,777	A	5,139	B
2001–02	18,381	A	16,061	A
2002–03	11,163	B	16,902	A
2003–04	10,667	B	14,868	A
2004–05	11,495	B	12,103	A
2005–06	9,037	B	8,589	A
2006–07	8,589	B	6,719	A
2007–08	11,543	C1	7,276	B
2008–09	10,932	C1	13,352	A
2009–10	14,331	C1	11,992	A
2010–11	10,553	C1	12,676	A
2011–12	14,084	B	9,649	A
2012–13	15,402	B	10,579	A
2013–14	21,172	A	9,149	A
2014–15	19,299	A	10,652	A
2015–16	18,194	A	11,247	A
2016–17	14,774	B	11,632	A
2017–18	17,333	A	12,540	A
2018–19	10,574	B	13,138	A
2019–20	18,098	A	3,809	B

Attendance figures taken from http://www.stadiapostcards.com/

== 1990 FIFA World Cup ==
The stadium was one of the venues of the 1990 FIFA World Cup, and held the following matches:

Date	Team #1	Res.	Team #2	Round
12 June 1990	Belgium	2–0	South Korea	Group E
17 June 1990	Belgium	3–1	Uruguay	Group E
21 June 1990	Belgium	1–2	Spain	Group E
26 June 1990	Spain	1–2 (a.e.t.)	Yugoslavia	Round of 16
