= Grid-tied electrical system =

Electrical energy storage system

A grid-tied electrical system, also called tied to grid or grid tie system, is a semi-autonomous electrical generation or grid energy storage system which links to the mains to feed excess capacity back to the local mains electrical grid. When insufficient electricity is available, electricity drawn from the mains grid can make up the shortfall. Conversely when excess electricity is available, it is sent to the main grid. When the Utility or network operator restricts the amount of energy that goes into the grid, it is possible to prevent any input into the grid by installing Export Limiting devices.

When batteries are used for storage, the system is called battery-to-grid (B2G), which includes vehicle-to-grid (V2G).

== How it works ==
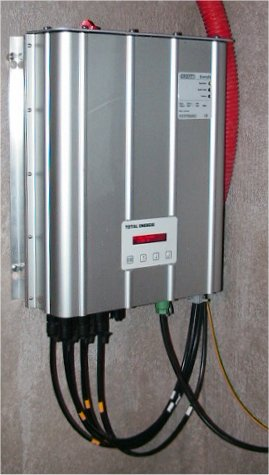
Grid-tied Inverter

Direct Current (DC) electricity from sources such as hydro, wind or solar is passed to an inverter which is grid tied. The inverter monitors the alternating current mains supply frequency and generates electricity that is phase matched to the mains. When the grid fails to accept power during a "black out", most inverters can continue to provide courtesy power.

== Battery-to-grid ==
A key concept of this system is the possibility of creating an electrical micro-system that is not dependent on the grid-tie to provide a high level quality of service. If the mains supply of the region is unreliable, the local generation system can be used to power important equipment.

Battery-to-grid can also spare the use of fossil fuel power plants to supply energy during peak loads on the public electric grid. Regions that charge based on time of use metering may benefit by using stored battery power during prime time.

== Environmentally friendly ==
Local generation can be from an environmentally friendly source such as pico hydro, solar panels or a wind turbine. Individuals can choose to install their own system if an environmentally friendly mains provider is not available in their location.

== Small scale start ==
A micro generation facility can be started with a very small system such as a home wind power generation, photovoltaic (solar cells) generation, or micro combined heat and power (Micro-CHP) system.

== Sell to and buy from mains ==
- Excess electricity can be sold to mains.
- Electrical shortfall can be bought from mains.

== List of countries or regions that legally allow grid-tied electrical systems ==
- Armenia
- Australia
- Bangladesh
- Bosnia and Herzegovina
- Brazil
- Canada
- Chile
- Dominican Republic
- El Salvador
- European Union
- Guatemala
- India
- Iran
- Israel
- Japan
- Jordan
- Mexico
- New Zealand
- Pakistan
- Panama
- Philippines (via Meralco)
- Russia (from Dec 2019)
- Singapore
- South Africa (Only by arrangement with municipality)
- Sri Lanka
- United States of America
- Venezuela (no legal restrictions)

== See also ==
- Cost of electricity by source
- Distributed network
- Electric power transmission
- Electranet
- Photovoltaic system
- Grid tie inverter
- Inverter
- Deep cycle battery
- Power outage
- V2G
- Grid-connected photovoltaic power system
- Off the grid - direct current buildings
