= Gravitation water vortex power plant =

Hydroelectric power generator that uses a round basin and a drain

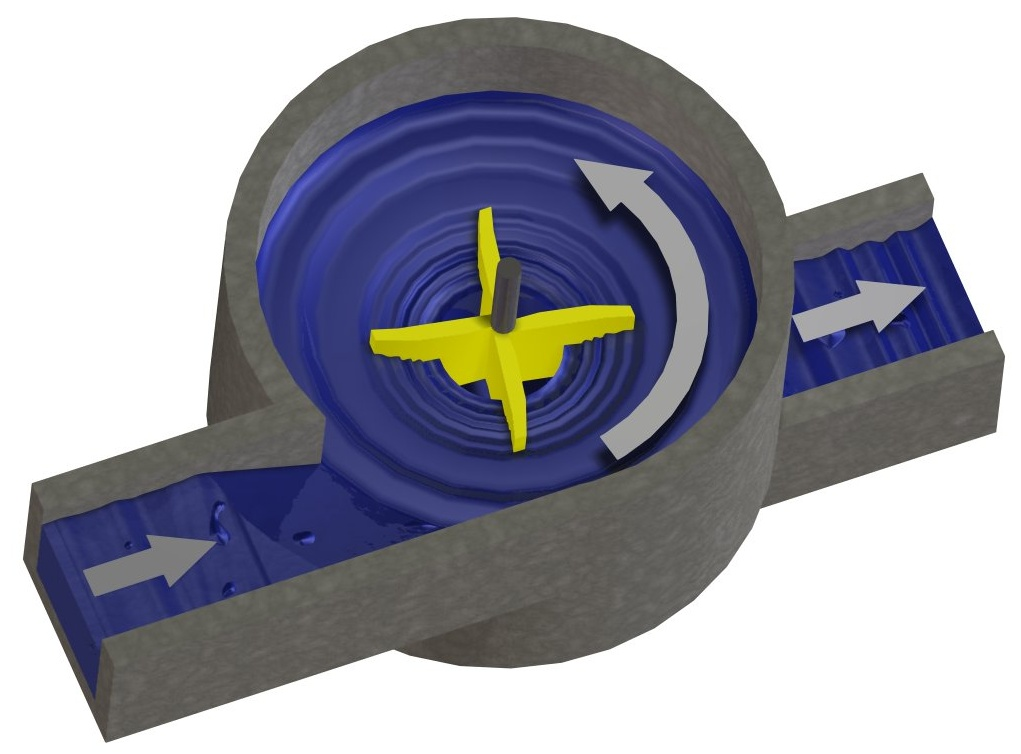
A schematic presentation of a gravitation water vortex power plant, showing the turbine in yellow

The gravitation water vortex power plant is a type of micro-hydro-vortex turbine system which converts energy in a moving fluid to rotational energy using a low hydraulic head of 0.7–3 metres (2 ft 4 in – 9 ft 10 in). This technology is based on a round basin with a central drain. Above the drain, the water forms a stable line vortex which drives a water turbine.

Precourse designs were patented in 1877 and 1967.

The specific design described here, the Kouris Centri Turbine, was first patented by Greek-Australian lawyer and inventor Paul Kouris in 1996, who was searching for a way to harness the power inherent in a vortex.

Later, Austrian Inventor Franz Zotlöterer created a similar turbine while attempting to find a way to aerate water without an external power source.

== Design ==
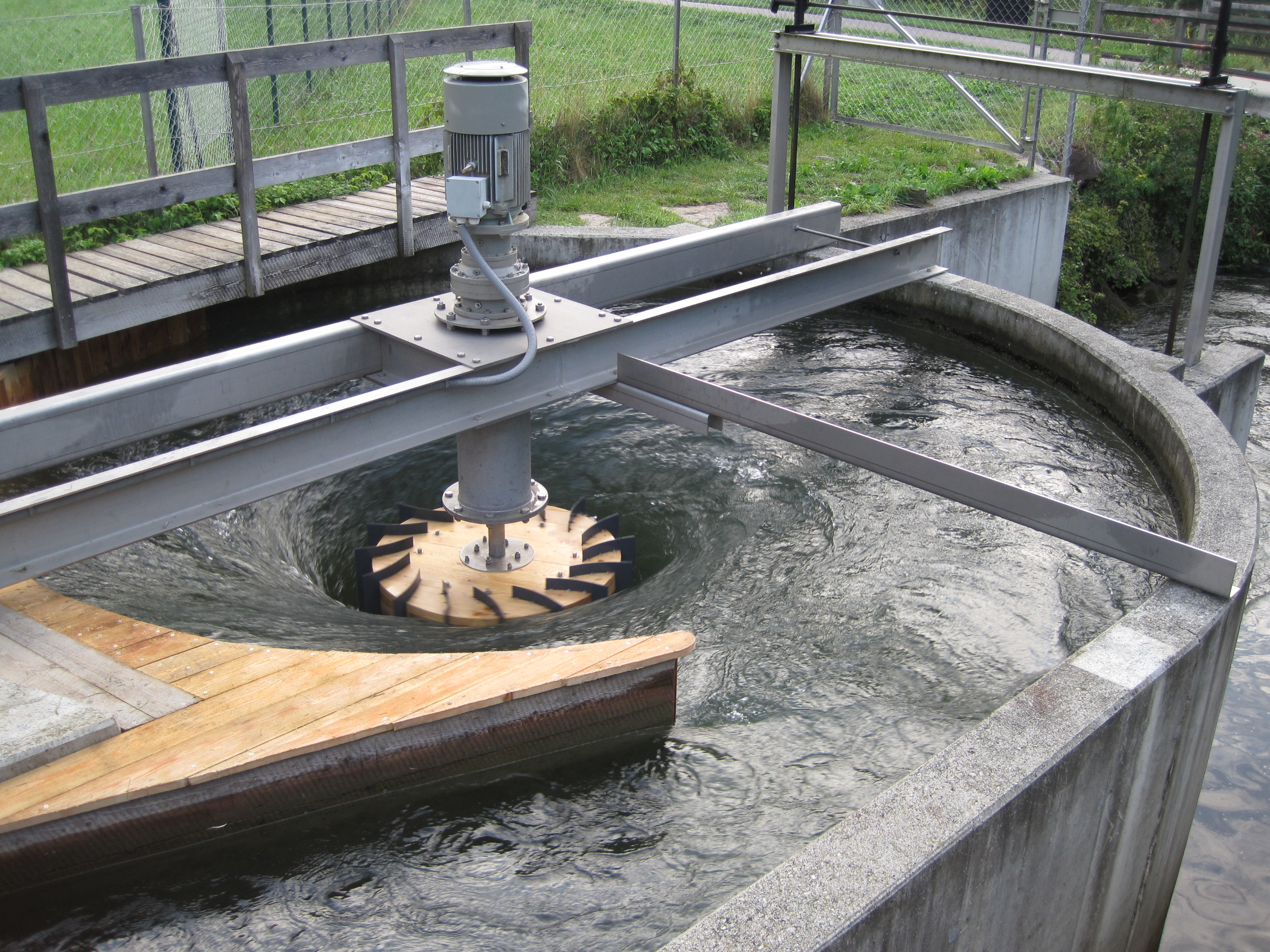
A gravitation water vortex plant with a Zotlöterer turbine near Ober-Grafendorf, Austria

The water passes through a straight inlet and then passes tangentially into a round basin. The water forms a vortex over the center bottom drain of the basin. A turbine withdraws rotational energy from the vortex, which is converted into electric energy by a generator.

The turbine's theoretical energy conversion efficiency is up to 85%; a test installation reported 73% efficiency, and after a year of use the installation cost was just under one US dollar per watt of output capacity.

The turbine's aeration of the water is used to improve water conditions, while the reduced speeds of the turbine and the lack of cavitation are designed so that most types of fish can pass through the turbine freely, something, which is much more difficult to achieve at normal hydro plants that require additional structures for the fish migration.
