= Settle Hydro =

Hydroelectric power station in North Yorkshire, England

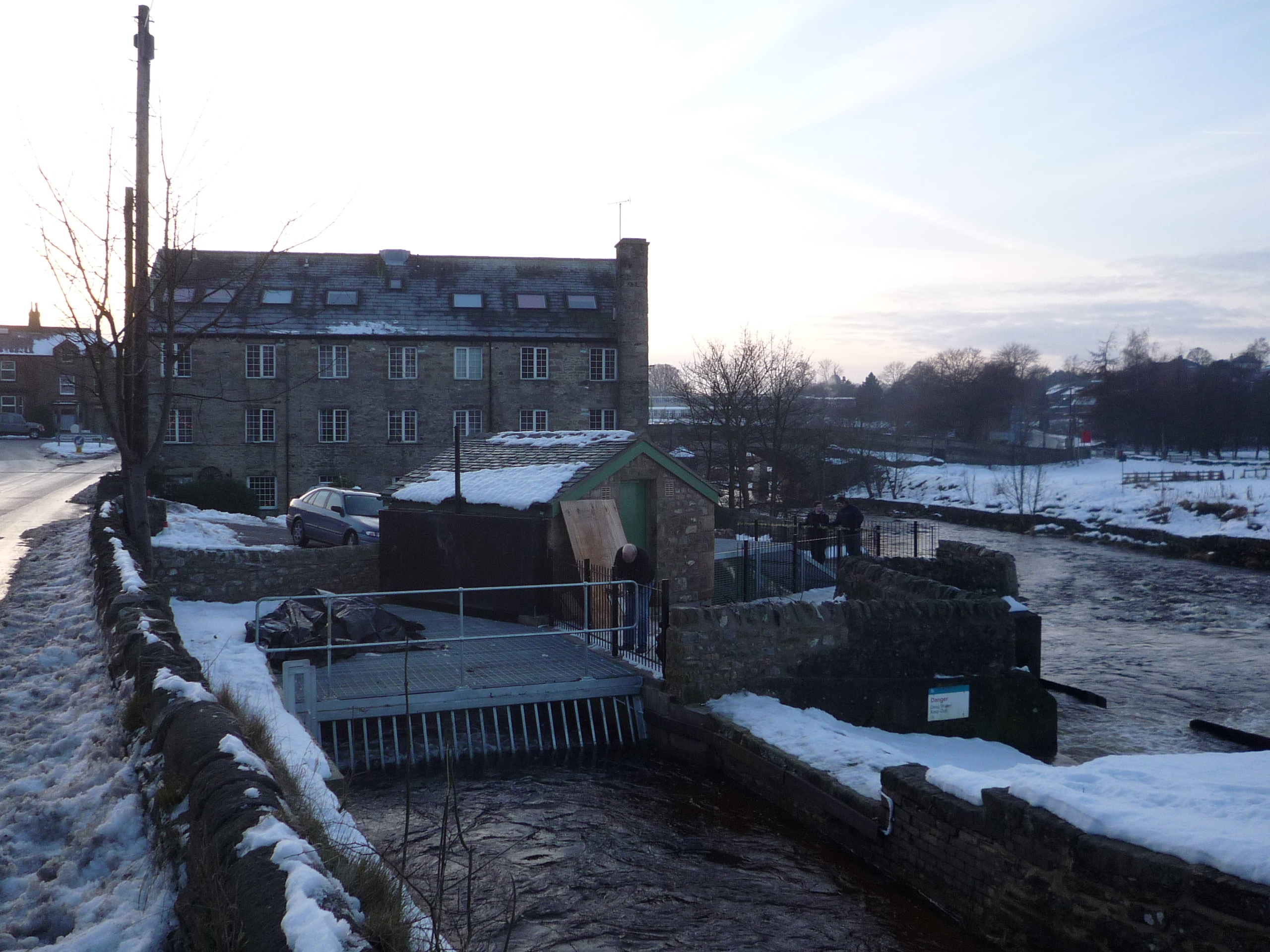
- Country: England
- Location: Settle, North Yorkshire
- Coordinates: 54.0726°N 2.2808°W

Power generation
- Nameplate capacity: 50 kW

External links
- Website: www.settlehydro.org.uk
- Commons: Related media on Commons

Settle Hydro is a micro hydroelectric scheme, owned by the community, in Settle, North Yorkshire, England. It is located on the River Ribble, at Settle Weir near Bridge End Mill. It generates 50 kW of electricity using a screw turbine in part of the former mill race.

== History ==
Settle weir was built across the Ribble to provide a head for the Bridge End Mill which was built to mill corn and was then converted to spin cotton. Later the mill became a woodworking shop turning imported cedar into furniture for local chapels. Although the wheel still turns, it is not connected to a shaft and the mill building has been converted to housing.

Planning permission and the Abstraction Licence were granted in February 2009 and the share issue started in September 2008 raised the necessary capital of £410,000. Lakeland Marine Construction began work in June 2009 and completed it in October with Settle Hydro Ltd generating electricity by November of the same year. Over the forty-year lifetime of the scheme that generates 165,000 kWh per annum, it is envisaged that 3,200 tonnes of carbon will be saved.

The screw was constructed in Germany.

Despite the installation of a fish ladder adjacent to the screw, the fish numbers upstream have dropped and it is believed that the noise from the screw is scaring the salmon. During periods of low water flow the turbine automatically shuts down to maintain a constant flow of water through the fish ladder.

== See also ==
- List of mills in North Yorkshire
- Torrs Hydro
