= Pico hydro =

Hydroelectric power generation under 5 kW

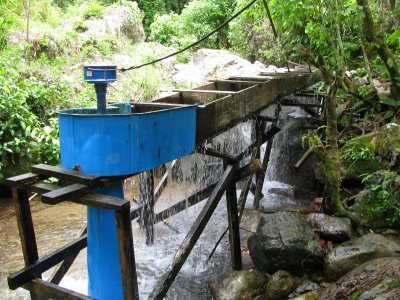
A pico hydro system made by the Sustainable Vision project from Baylor University

Pico hydro is a term used for hydroelectric power generation of under 5 kW. These generators have proven to be useful in small, remote communities that require only a small amount of electricity – for example, to power one or two fluorescent light bulbs and a TV or radio in 50 or so homes. Even smaller turbines of 200–300 W may power a single home with a drop of only 1 metre (3.3 ft). Pico-hydro setups typically are run-of-stream, meaning that a reservoir of water is not created, only a small weir is common, pipes divert some of the flow, drop this down a gradient, and through the turbine before being exhausted back to the stream.

Like other hydroelectric and renewable source power generation, pollution and consumption of fossil fuels is reduced, though there is still typically an environmental cost to the manufacture of the generator and distribution methods.

== Small-scale DIY hydroplants ==
With a growing DIY-community and an increasing interest in environmentally friendly "green energy", some hobbyists have endeavored to build their own hydroelectric plants from old water mills, from kits, or from scratch. The DIY-community has used abandoned water mills to mount a waterwheel and electrical generating components. This approach has also been popularized in the TV series It's Not Easy Being Green. These are usually smaller turbines of ~5 kW or less. Through the internet, the community is now able to obtain plans to construct DIY-water turbines, and there is a growing trend toward building them for domestic requirements. The DIY-hydroelectric plants are now being used both in developed countries and in developing countries, to power residences and small businesses. Two examples of pico hydro power can be found in the towns of Kithamba and Thimba in the Central Province of Kenya. These produce 1.1 kW and 2.2 kW, respectively. Local residents were trained to maintain the hydro schemes. The pico hydro sites in Kenya won Ashden Awards for Sustainable Energy.

Using a pumped-storage system of cisterns and small generators, pico hydro may also be effective for "closed loop" home systems.

== Manufacturers ==
In Vietnam, several Chinese manufacturers have sold pico-powerplants at prices as low as $20–70 for a powerplant of 300–500 W. However, the devices sold are said to be low in quality and may damage connected equipment if connected improperly.

Sam Redfield of the Appropriate Infrastructure Development Group (AIDG) has developed a pico-hydro generator made from common PVC pipe and a modified Toyota alternator housed in a five-gallon bucket. The generator was developed to provide power to communities without access to the electricity grid in developing countries. Envisioned as an energy source to charge cell phones, provide lighting and charge batteries, the generator is designed to be made by artisans with basic skills and can be built for less than $150. The Toyota alternator used in the generator is converted to a permanent magnet alternator allowing it to generate power at low RPMs. The Five Gallon Bucket Hydroelectric Generator was the subject of a work group at the 2008 International Development Design Summit (IDDS) at the Massachusetts Institute of Technology. During the Summer of 2013, an energy project in Abra Malaga, Peru was completed using the bucket generator.

A website has been put together as a forum for ideas and further iterations of the generator that includes a build manual. Common centrifugal water pumps, can be operated in reverse to act as turbines. While these machines rarely have optimum hydraulic characteristics when operated as turbines, their availability and low cost makes them attractive.

== Transmission distance ==
If the power will be used more than 30 metres (98 ft) from the generator, then the transmission distance may be an important consideration. Many small systems use automotive alternators producing 12 VDC, and possibly charging a battery. For example, a 12 V system that produces 1 kW of power has a flow of 80 A and the wire size is 4-gauge. The purchase cost of two strands of wire 300 metres (980 ft) long for this voltage and amperage was typically $2400(US) in 2015. To avoid such a large wire cost a higher voltage and lower current is required. If a 240 VAC alternator is used instead the flow is only 4 A over 300 metres (980 ft) of 18 gauge wire costing $180(US). The cost of wire resulted in North America using 120/240 VAC after DC voltage lost the war of the currents in the late 1800s. Another approach to reduce wire costs is to have a 12 VDC alternator with a short high current connection to an inverter outputting 120 VAC or 240 VAC at a much lower current on a long length of thinner wire.

== See also ==
- Small hydro 1 to 20 MW
- Micro hydro 5 to 100 kW
- Hydro power
- Renewable energy
- Sustainable energy
- Grid-tied electrical system
