= List of mills in Derbyshire =

This is a list of the cotton and other textile mills in Derbyshire, England. The first mills were built in the 1760s in the Derwent Valley by Arkwright and Strutt, and were powered by the water of the River Derwent. The abundance of water from the River Etherow and its tributaries led to mills being built in Longdendale and Glossopdale, and similarly along the River Wye in Millers Dale. As the industry developed, the mills changed hands, were demolished, were converted to use steam, or consolidated into larger units. They changed their names and their functions. Water-powered mills were smaller than the later steam-powered mills found in Greater Manchester. Parts of Derbyshire have been subsumed into Stockport.

== Derwent Valley ==
This includes Derby, and Belper

Name	Architect	Location	Built	Demolished	Served (Years)
North Mill		Belper 53°01′45″N 1°29′11″W	1786/1804		
	1186846Notes: The original North Mill, completed in 1786 by Jedediah Strutt, was destroyed by fire in 1803. Its replacement was built in 1804 by his son, William Strutt, on the foundations of the old mill and is one of the oldest surviving examples of an iron-framed 'fire-proof' building in the world.				
East Mill		Belper 53°01′44″N 1°29′09″W	1912	Standing	114
	1336982Notes: A fortress-like, seven-storey building, 24 bays by 11, with four corner turrets with Italianate tower, it was constructed by the English Sewing Cotton Company in 1912.				
Round Mill		Belper 53°01′41″N 1°29′11″W	1816		210
	Notes: Demolished; designed for bale-breaking.				
West Mill		Belper 53°01′42″N 1°29′12″W	1797		229
	Notes: Demolished.				
2nd South Mill		Belper 53°01′42″N 1°29′12″W	1811		215
	Notes: Demolished.				
Junction Mill		Belper 53°01′42″N 1°29′12″W			
	Notes: Demolished.				
Reeling Mill		Belper 53°01′42″N 1°29′12″W	1807		219
	Notes: Demolished.				
de Bradelei Mill		Belper 53°01′18″N 1°29′06″W			
	Notes: George Brettle & Co., makers of hosiery.				
Unity Mill		Derwent St, Belper 53°01′25″N 1°29′10″W	mid 19th century		
	1087354Notes: A corn mill converted to cotton spinning by John Strutt (1853), then furniture manufacture.				
1850 Gritstone warehouse		Belper			
	Notes: The Ward, Sturt and Sharp hosiery warehouse from 1850.				
Boar's Head Cotton Mills		Darley Abbey 52°56′38″N 1°28′28″W	1782-1862		
	Notes: The Evans Mills produced high-quality 'Boar's Head' sewing cotton. Long Mill was built in 1782, operational in 1788, then burnt down in 1789 and was rebuilt in 1790. The top floor was used as a schoolroom for their child workers. It connects to West Mill (1821), Middle Mill (1804–05) and East Mill (1811). Separate is a Gassing Shed (1862) where the thread was singed, and the North Mill (1835). The free-standing engine house has been demolished but the chimney remains.				
Cromford Mills		Cromford 53°06′31″N 1°33′21″W		1771	
	1248010Notes: The first cotton mill set up by Richard Arkwright to use the "Spinning Jenny" to make cotton thread. Later a paint factory.				
Bath Street Mill		Derby	1851		175
	Notes:				
Queen Street Mill		Derby			
Lombe's Mill		Derby	18th century		
	Notes:				
Masson Mill		Matlock Bath 53°06′44″N 1°33′44″W	1783		243
	Notes:				
Milford Mills		Milford 53°00′18″N 1°28′53″W			
	Notes: The Milford mill complex, built by Jebediah and William Strutt, spanned the A6 toll road, upstream from Milford bridge. Started in the 1780s to spin cotton, it expanded to include bleaching and dyeing mills. William built the warehouse in 1793, experimenting to produce a multi-storey fire-proof mill.The extant dyehouse near the bridge was a later more successful attempt.				

== River Wye ==
Name	Architect	Location	Built	Demolished	Served (Years)
Cressbrook Mills		Cressbrook SK173726 53°15′00″N 1°44′31″W	1815		211
	1158897Notes:				
Litton Mill		Millersdale SK161729 53°15′11″N 1°45′36″W			
	Notes:				
Lumford Mill		Bakewell 53°13′05″N 1°41′01″W			
	Notes:				
Rowsley Mill					

== The mills of New Mills and Rowarth ==
Name	Architect	Location	Built	Demolished	Served (Years)
St. George's Works (Wellington New Mill)					
Grove Paper Mill					
Ned Mill					

=== Rowarth Brook ===
Name	Architect	Location	Built	Demolished	Served (Years)
Top Mill		Rowarth			
Grove Mill		Rowarth			
	Notes: A print works				
Froggatt's Mill		Rowarth			
Lower Mill		Rowarth			
Little Mill		Rowarth SK011889 53°23′49″N 1°59′06″W	1930		96
	Notes: The oldest-known mill in the New Mills area, built between the inn and the brook. It was a two-storey building powered by a waterwheel. The remains were swept away by the flood of 18 June 1930.				
Ringstones (Alma Mount)		Rowarth			
Bate Mill		Thornsett SK007868 53°22′41″N 1°59′28″W			
	Notes: 1889: bleachers and dyers				

=== River Goyt ===
Name	Architect	Location	Built	Demolished	Served (Years)
Torr Vale Mill aka Stafford's Mill; Lowe's Mill		The Torrs, New Mills SJ999854 53°21′53″N 2°00′11″W	1788	****	212
	1119721Notes:				
Torr Mill, a.k.a. Schofield's Mills		The Torrs, New Mills 53°21′50″N 2°00′01″W	1838	1912	74
	Notes: Spindleage: (1811) 14 mules, 2802 spindles, (1848) 20 mules, 13,792 spindles, boiler by Butterley. The first mill was built in 1794 by Samuel Schofield, for cotton spinning. It was powered by water. It was burnt down on 22 October 1838 while being operated by John Sheldon. The second bigger five-storey mill was built immediately on the same site. A chimney was added in 1846, suggesting that this mill was operated by steam and water. The mill was occupied by Josiah Mellor and John Roberts until 1857, when it passed to Messrs Hibbert and Alcock cotton spinners. In June 1873, the mill was floated with capital of £4000 as a co-operative venture known as the Torr Mill Spinning Company. In 1883 a new boiler was installed. The mill became unviable in 1900 and the machinery was removed. Two further firms attempted to use the mill but it was destroyed by fire on 2 December 1912. The leat for this mill passed under the Queens Road bridge and in a trough over the River Sett, and the tail race continued downstream under the Union Road bridge. Torrs Hydro has been built on the site.				
Rock Mill, a.k.a. Crowther's Mill		The Torrs, New Mills, 53°21′54″N 2°00′08″W			
Hague Bar (Hague/Haigh) Mill					
Strines Printworks		Strines, Marple, 53°22′35″N 2°02′23″W			

=== River Sett ===
Also known as River Kinder.

Name	Architect	Location	Built	Demolished	Served (Years)
Hyde Bank (Beard) (Goddard Mill)		Hide Bank, New Mills SK001856 53°22′01″N 2°00′00″W	1785	Standing	241
	Notes: The first mill was a woollen mill which burnt down. This four-storey gritstone former cotton mill, on Hyde Bank Road straddling the River Sett, dates from the early 19th century. The mill used to be a finishing mill for W S Lowe & Sons, but has been shut for a number of years. It has now been converted into flats and the bridge on the left is a recent replacement. The first cotton spinning mill was constructed in 1785; before that an early woollen and fulling occupied the site. Now in multiple occupation.				
Birch Vale Printworks		SK 020868 53°22′41″N 1°58′16″W,			
Garrison Works		Thornsett, SK 015869 53°22′44″N 1°58′44″W			
London Place (Watford Bridge Printworks) Watford Mill from Mellor Rd, New Mills in 1963		Sett Valley SK 005863 53°22′26″N 1°59′38″W			
	Notes: 1889: calico printing.				
Salem (Bower) Mill		SK002858 53°22′08″N 1°59′53″W			
	Notes: Two-storey gritstone buildings, formerly a cotton mill of the 1780s and later a chemical works. Next to the medieval manorial corn mill.				
Barnes Top Shop (Torr Top Mill) (Midland Ironworks)					
Grove (Wyatt's) (Barnes) Mill			1790		76

=== Peak Forest Canal ===
Name	Architect	Location	Built	Demolished	Served (Years)
Brunswick Mill/Works		Newtown, New Mills SJ997849 53°21′40″N 2°00′22″W			
	Notes: Three- and four-storey gritstone mill building (datestone 1883) on the Peak Forest Canal. Formerly a cotton mill, bought in 1868 by the Quaker, Edward Godward 1841–1908, who became the first chairman of New Mills UDC, in 1894. Spindleage 1887: 11,000 kitting and sewing cottons. It was extended and used as a sweet factory by Swizzels Matlow.				
Victoria Mill		Newtown, New Mills	1860		125
	Notes: 1889: Josseph Froggatt & Son, 1,000 spindles. Victoria Mill was built in 1860 and when it closed in 1985 was the last cotton spinning mill to work in New Mills. It was partly destroyed by fire on 13 March 1986 and has subsequently been largely demolished. There is a picture of it just after the fire on the front of New Mills – A look back at its Industrial Heritage (1997).				
Woodside (New Brunswick) Mill		Newtown, New Mills			
Albion Mill		Newtown, New Mills SJ996848 53°21′36″N 2°00′25″W			
	Notes: Three- and four-storey gritstone mill building of 1859. This was the first of a group of mid-19th century cotton mills erected around the Peak Forest Canal.				
Warks Moor Mill		Newtown, New Mills			
	Notes: 1889: Francis Rowbottom, 8000 spindles				
Redmoor Mill		Newtown, New Mills			
Albert Mill		Newtown, New Mills			
	Notes: 1889:Bleachers and Dyers and paper maker				
Some of these mills are occupied by Swizzels Matlow. One mill was built about 1843, and part was destroyed by fire in 1983. Swizzels Matlow's address is Albion Road.

== Other ==
Name	Architect	Location	Built	Demolished	Served (Years)
Brunt Mill		Longnor, SK085646 53°10′41″N 1°52′26″W			
Calver Mill		Calver SK 247745 53°16′01″N 1°37′52″W	1804	Standing	119
	1068650Notes: The mill opened in 1778, built by John Gardom of Bakewell and John Pares of Leicester on the site of a corn mill. To use Arkwright's two patents there was an initial premium of £7000 and an annual royalty of £1000. By 1785, the mill had been developed and stood at three storeys. In 1799, however, the River Derwent washed away Calver Bridge and took part of the mill with it; shortly after the mill was burned to the ground. A new seven-storey mill was subsequently constructed, and began production in 1804. By 1830 it employed 200 workers some being parish apprentices. In 1833 new, larger, waterwheels were constructed. Spinning finished in 1923. In the 1980, the mill featured in Pat Reid's television drama Colditz, standing in for Colditz Castle.				
Clough Mill		Little Hayfield SK032882 53°23′28″N 1°57′11″W			
	Notes: A former water-powered and later steam-powered textile mill. Converted to apartments in 1989.				
Edale Mill		Edale SK 134854 53°21′54″N 1°48′00″W	1795	Standing	139
	1096614Notes: This mill has now been converted into apartments. The first mill was a corn mill driven by the River Noe. In 1795 Nicholas Cresswell enlarged the building, taking James Harrison, Robert Blackwell and Joseph Fletcher as partners. A three-storey building with external stair column, the present mill was added a little later. The mill which passed to the Fine Spinners & Doublers Ltd, and cotton manufacturing ceased here in 1934. Many of the women workers came from Castleton, walking to the mill via Hollins Cross at a height of 1,250 feet (380 m). This was a climb of 650 feet (200 m); during bad weather they would sleep at the mill.				
Haarlem Mill		Derby Rd, Wirksworth	1780	Standing	246
	1335116Notes: Cotton spinning mill erected by Richard Arkwright				
Hayfield Fulling Mill		Hayfield, SK055863 53°22′26″N 1°55′08″W			
Lumb Mill; Lambs Hole		Kettleshulme, SJ 988804 53°19′16″N 2°01′08″W			
Phoside Mill		Hayfield SK037859 53°22′12″N 1°56′46″W			
	Notes:				
Primrose Mill		Hayfield, SK031880 53°23′20″N 1°57′18″W			
Walk Mill		Hayfield, SK037870 53°22′48″N 1°56′46″W			
