= Kouris Centri Turbine =

Rotational kinetic energy turbine

The Kouris Centri Turbine (KCT) is a gravitation water vortex turbine that utilizes rotational kinetic energy for generating power, contrasting with the linear kinetic energy approach of conventional hydroelectric systems.

== History ==
The Kouris Centri Turbine was conceived in 1975 by Greek-Australian barrister, Paul Kouris, whilst he was a law student at Monash University. He kept the idea of this turbine secret for more than twenty years and during that period, he developed it with the assistance of engineers, until it became publicly known in 1996. Initially met with skepticism and dismissal by physicists and power generation specialists, his concept was eventually presented at an EnergyChallenge conference in Sydney. In Victoria, Australia, he constructed a prototype hydro-electric system using large water tanks. The prototype demonstrated a power output increase of up to 27 percent when the turbine was placed in a water vortex, compared to its traditional downstream position.

In 2000, the USPTO granted a patent to Paul S. Kouris for the invention.

In 2004, a proof of concept was carried out on the private property of Kouris. Following this, Sustainability Victoria allocated a $40,000 grant for a subsequent proof of concept in Marysville. For this project, Kouris' team contributed an additional $40,000 in funding.

In 2006, Steve Hall, who was then the dean of engineering at Ballarat University, undertook mathematical modeling of the KCT. The results of this modeling were based on a reproduction of Kouris' original prototype system at the university. They were to be analyzed through computer simulations and intended to form the basis of a PhD thesis. This academic inquiry aimed to provide a controlled analysis of the KCT's performance.

In 2011, the European Patent Office granted a patent to Kouris for an application he filed in 1998.

In 2012, Paul Kouris collaborated with engineer Rohan Searle to develop a new prototype of a hydro power turbine which aimed to improve transportability, reduce costs, and enhance environmental sustainability.

== Design of the turbine ==
The KCT consists of a cylindrical chamber with a centrally located impeller. Water enters the chamber from the top, from either the left or right side, depending on the hemisphere of installation, and exits through a hollow section at the bottom, creating a vortex that drives the impeller. This motion powers a low rpm generator.

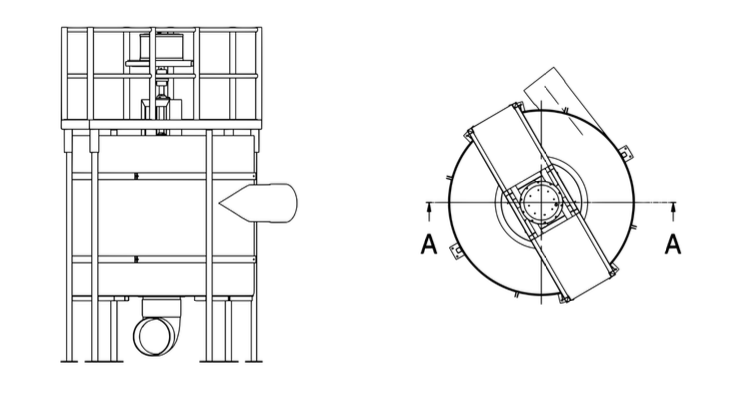
Diagram of the Kouris Centri Turbine, showing the vortex-driven chamber and central impeller. Created by Kourispower Pty Ltd

The KCT is designed to minimize energy losses, which is a common issue in traditional hydroelectric systems caused by water overflow. The KCT's approach includes submerging the wheel in water and utilizing the vortex's suction power, a feature claimed to enhance output efficiency.

== Operational requirements and types of turbines ==
The KCT's operational requirements differ from those of conventional turbines. It requires a lower water fall height to generate a vortex. The domestic model, for instance, features a vortex chamber 2 meters in diameter and 60 centimeters deep. This is smaller than the typical requirements for traditional turbines, which include a minimum fall height of three meters, large quantities of water, and extensive infrastructure.

Larger KCT models, each measuring 2 meters in diameter and depth, are designed for greater power generation and are claimed to be capable of powering multiple households.

== Manufacturing ==
The patent for the turbine is held by Paul Kouris and is currently being manufactured by KapaLamda in Greece.
