= Torrs Hydro =

Micro hydroelectric scheme in Derbyshire, England

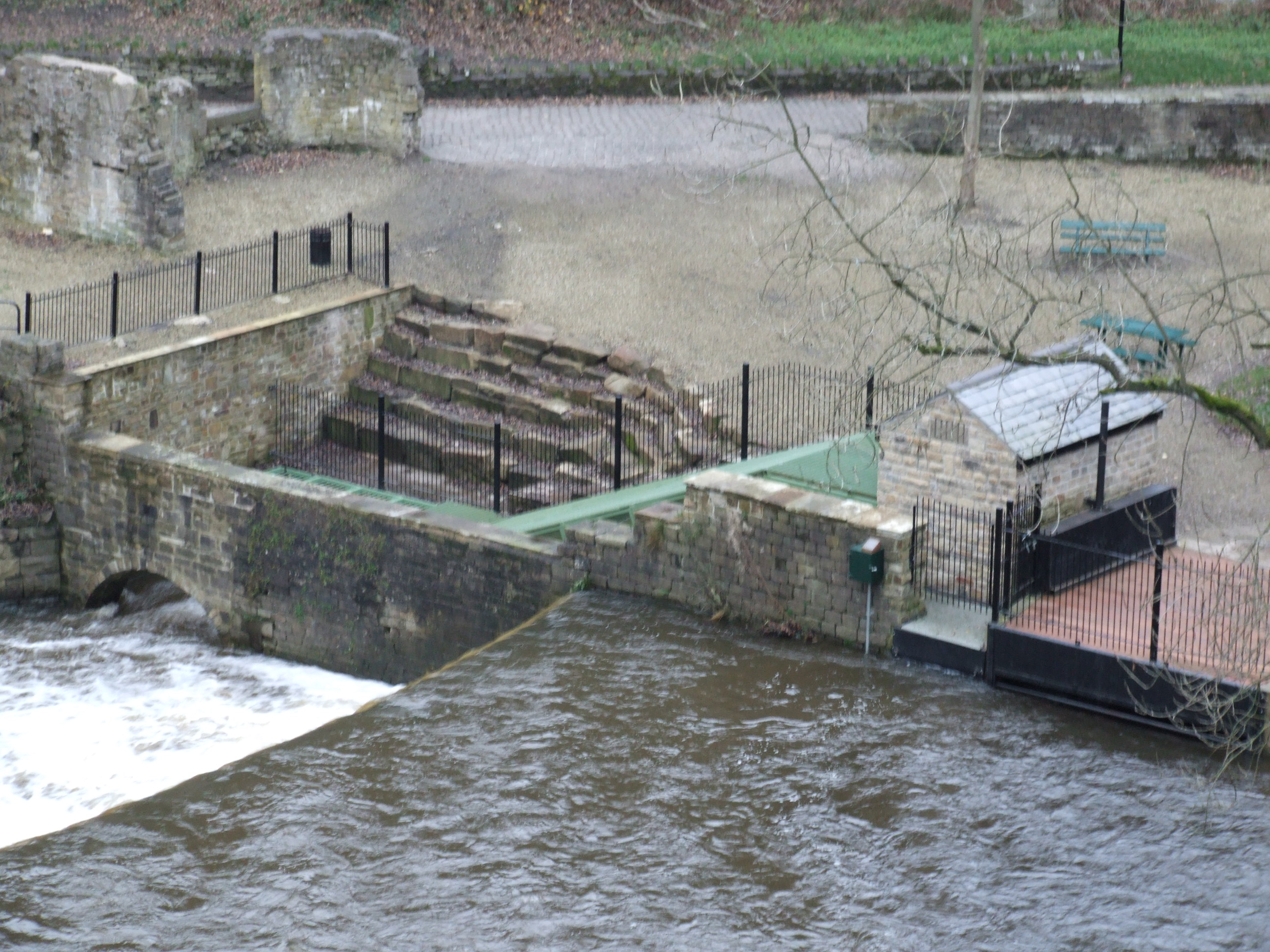
- Country: United Kingdom
- Coordinates: 53°21′50″N 2°00′00″W

Power generation
- Nameplate capacity: 63 kW

External links
- Website: torrshydro.org
- Commons: Related media on Commons

Torrs Hydro is a micro hydroelectric scheme, owned by the community, in New Mills, Derbyshire. It is on the River Goyt, immediately below its confluence with the River Sett at the Torr weir. A 2.4-metre diameter steel trough screw turbine generates up to 63 kW of electricity.

== History ==
Torr weir was built across the Goyt to provide a head for the Torr Mill, which occupied the same site. Torr Mill burnt down in 1912.

On 20 September 2007 Torrs Hydro New Mills Limited, an Industrial and Provident Society for the Benefit of the Community, was formed. £100,000 of capital was raised from 200 members.

Construction began in March 2008, and on 8 June the screw was delivered. It weighs 11 tonnes. Commissioning started in August and the scheme was handed over on 4 September 2008.

Torrs Hydro has an agreement to sell its electricity to The Co-operative Group, which uses it to power its businesses, including its Co-op Food branch in New Mills.

== Gallery ==
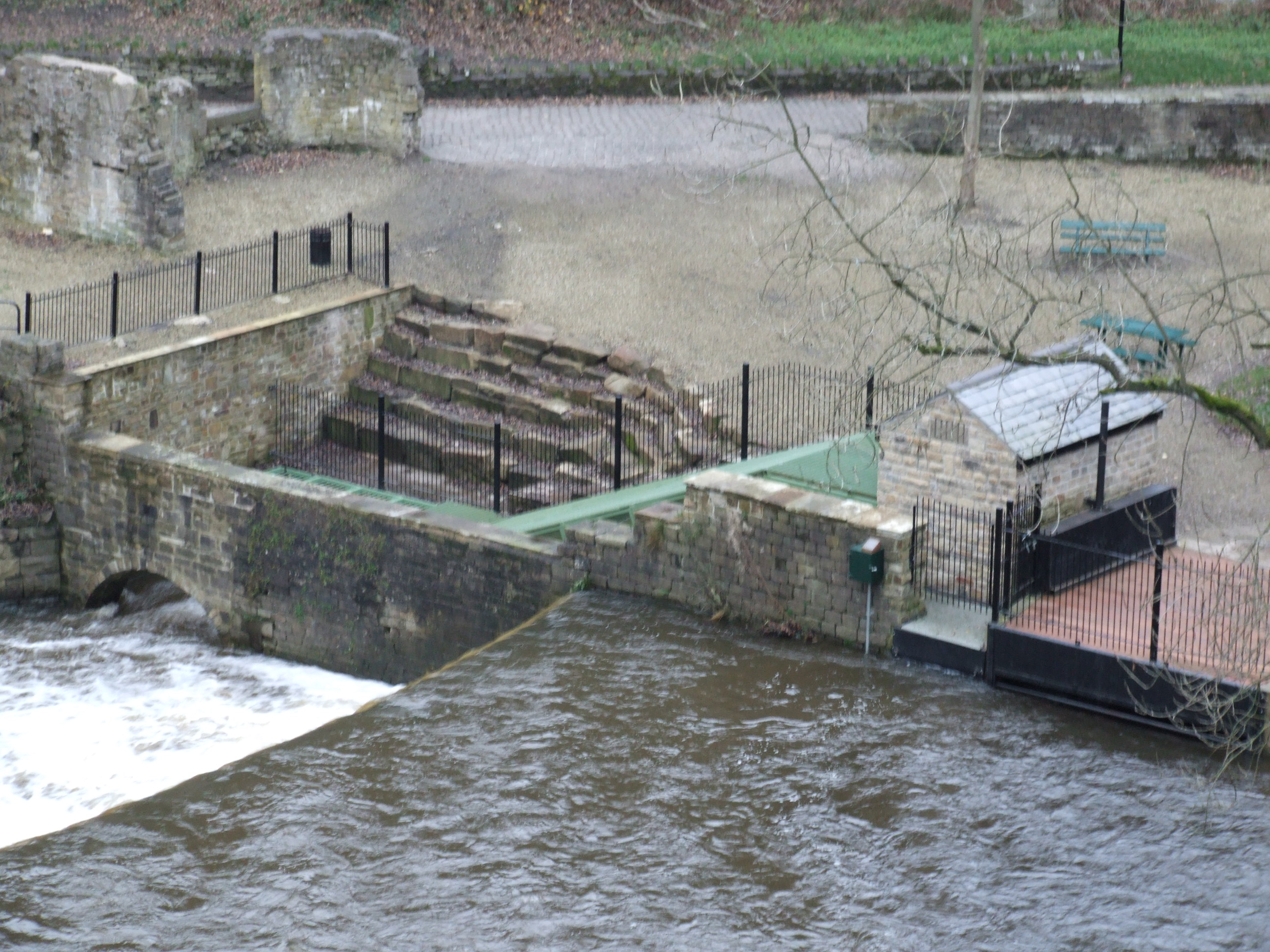
Torrs Hydro

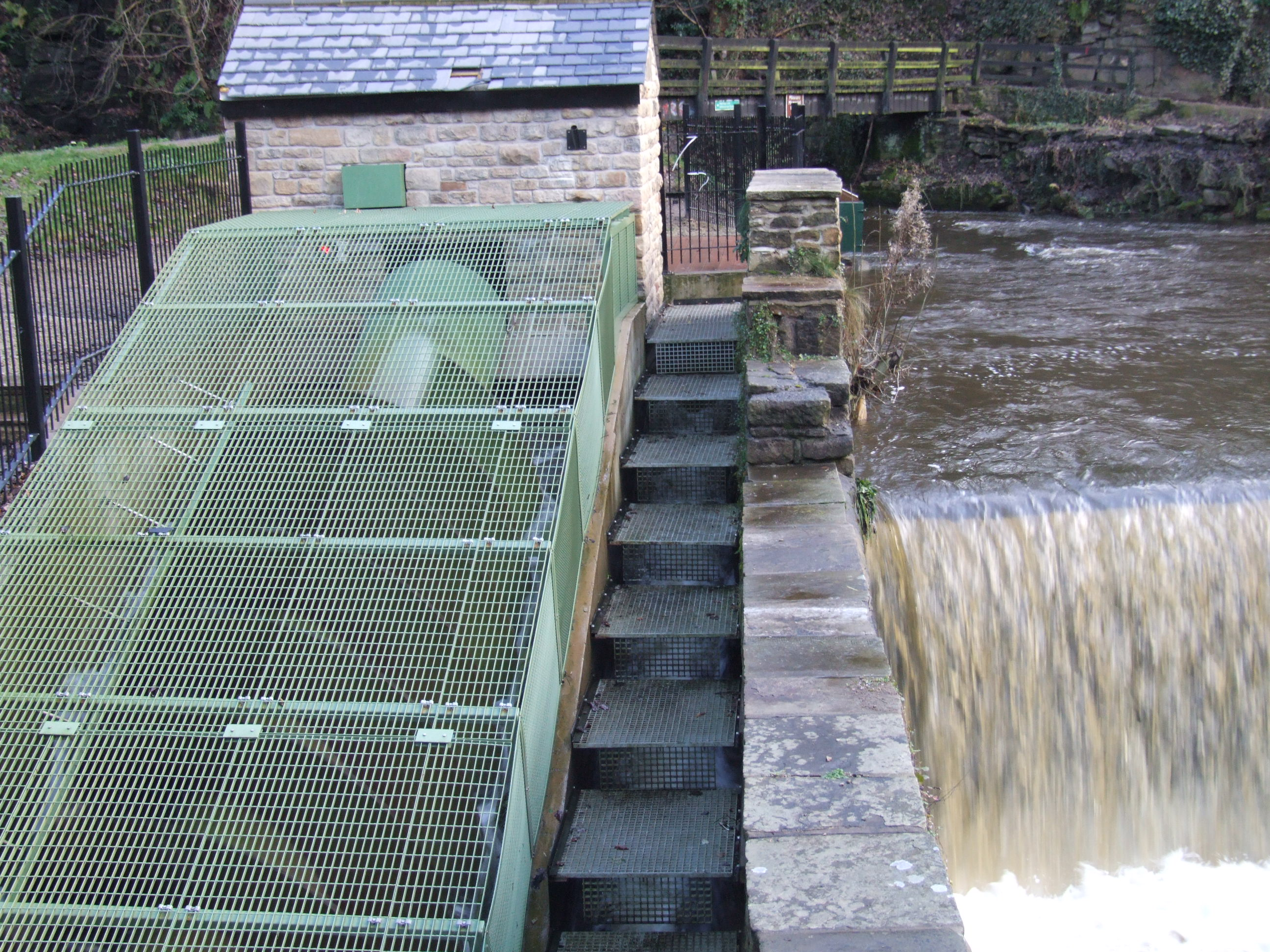
Closeup of the corkscrew obscured by a mesh for safety

== See also ==
- Settle Hydro, a similar scheme in North Yorkshire
