= Soft-switching three-level inverter =

A soft-switching three-level inverter (S3L inverter) is a high-efficiency power electronic inverter intended, in particular, for use with three-phase drives, as a grid-tie inverter for photovoltaic installations or wind turbines and in power supplies. The topology was developed in 2009 at HTWG Konstanz (Constance University of Applied Sciences).

== Operating principle ==
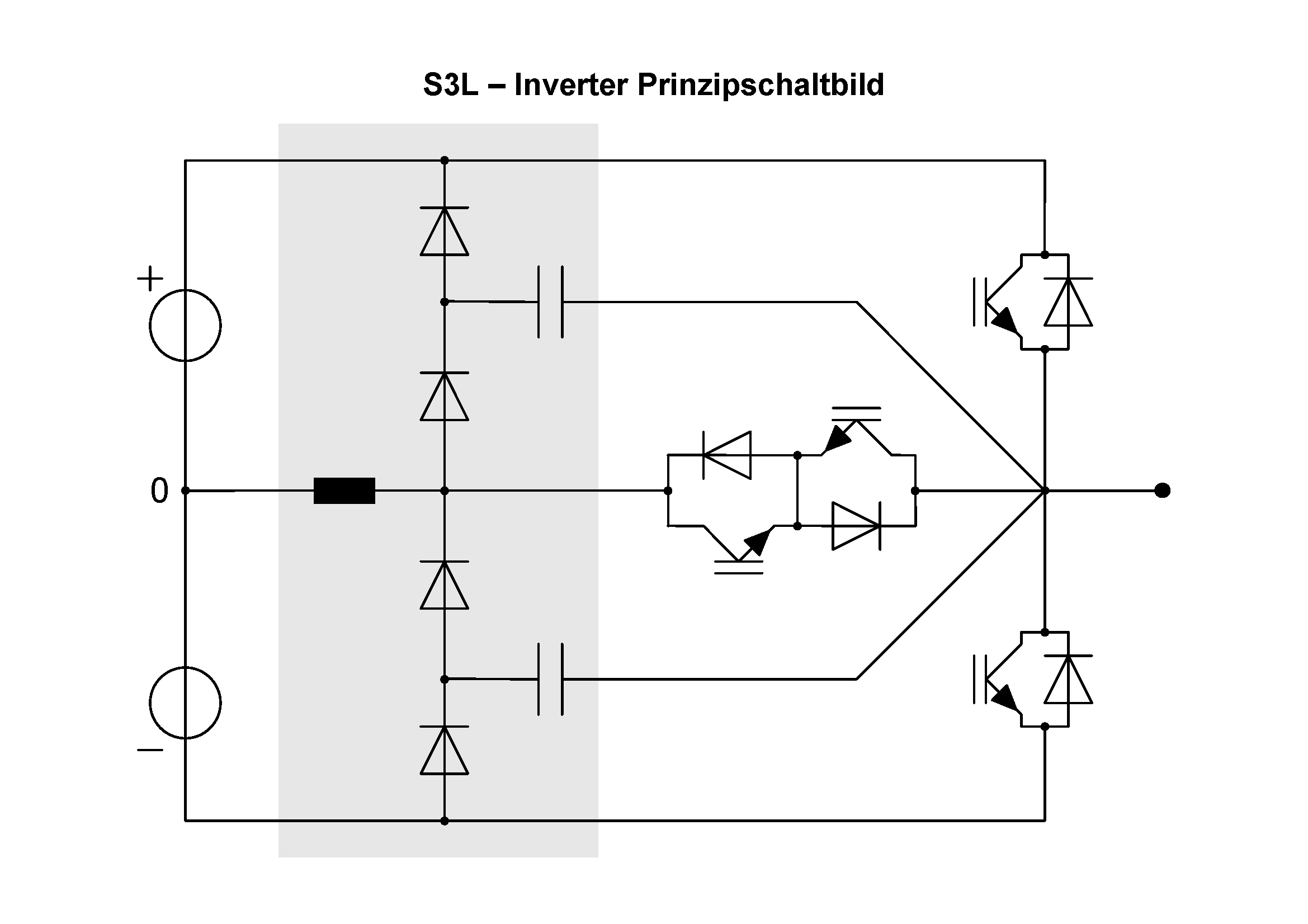
Schematic circuit diagram of the S3L inverter. The snubber circuit is highlighted in grey.

Inverters are used for converting DC voltage into AC voltage. Their construction typically makes use of power transistors and diodes. These are operated as electronic switches. In conventional designs using "hard" switching, this gives rise to switching losses which, especially for high values of the switching frequency, cause a reduction in their energy conversion efficiency. To improve their efficiency, high-power inverters (from about 10 kW) frequently make use of a technique referred to as a three-level design (three-level inverter).

Forming the basis of the S3L inverter is a hard-switching three-level inverter of this kind with a T-type topology. This base design is supplemented by a snubber circuit consisting of a few passive components. It prevents the occurrence of simultaneously high values of voltage and current, and hence high power dissipation values, during the switching process. All switching processes therefore take place in a "soft" manner. In this way switching losses are largely avoided. Furthermore, because the snubber circuit functions, in principle, without losses, the conversion efficiency of the inverter remains high even for high values of the switching frequency.
