= Electranet =

Electranet is a proposed smart electric grid which would allow people to sell electricity into the grid without any artificial caps. It was proposed in an op-ed article Al Gore wrote in a "My Turn" column for Newsweek in 2006.

Like the internet, which widely distributed information, the Electranet would allow homeowners and small businesses to operate small generating power facilities and contribute to local and regional energy needs by selling power into the grid at a rate that is determined by free market forces. Like the internet, which led to a surge of productivity, the Electranet's distributed generation model is hoped to lead to innovative power generation through alternative sources and lowering greenhouse gas emissions. Electranet advocates predict that as more people participate in the Electranet, the cost of electricity will continue to go down until it becomes free.

In a 2006 speech to NYU, Al Gore advocated deploying an Electranet as one way to reduce global warming, as well as reduce the cost of energy, by dropping the barriers to entry for average citizens to actively participate in the business of harnessing and distributing power. Al Gore frequently notes that "a lot of energy is all around us. Instead of having the sun bake us in the summer, why not gather that energy", he asks. "Why not collect from road surfaces, roofs, any painted surfaces and more?"

Al Gore has also said that "once there is a convenient way to sell energy into the grid, not only will homeowners be compelled to hop onto the grid and supply energy, but there will also be a brand new market to develop and then sell all sorts of energy gathering devices and technologies, such as solar paint, solar fabrics, thin films for windows, micro windmills, and more."

Al Gore mentioned the Electranet idea in his congressional Global Warming Testimony on March 21, 2007.

Electranet advocates predict that just like data on the internet, energy itself, including what is necessary for electric cars, will continue to be more economical as more people get onto the smart grid and supply power, and as more and more efficient technologies are developed for gathering the abundant energy around us. It is reasonable to imagine a day when there is no actual cost for driving, per mile, for energy, because of the abundance of energy coming from the Electranet.

== See also ==
- Grid-tied electrical system
- Post scarcity
- Vehicle-to-grid
