= Micro hydro =

Hydroelectric power generation of 5 to 100 kW of electricity

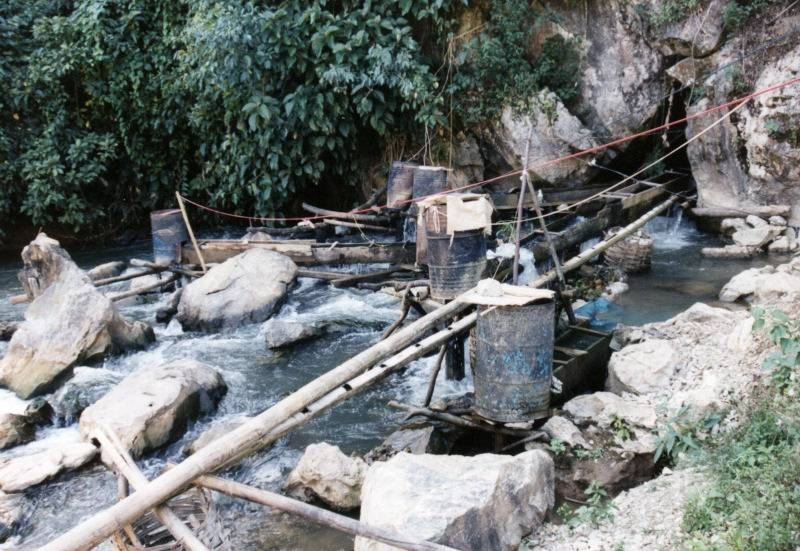
Micro hydro in northwest Vietnam

Micro hydro is a type of hydroelectric power that typically produces from 5 kW to 100 kW of electricity using the natural flow of water. Installations below 5 kW are called pico hydro. These installations can provide power to an isolated home or small community, or are sometimes connected to electric power networks, particularly where net metering is offered. There are many of these installations around the world, particularly in developing nations as they can provide an economical source of energy without the purchase of fuel. Micro hydro systems complement solar PV power systems because in many areas water flow, and thus available hydro power, is highest in the winter when solar energy is at a minimum. Micro hydro is frequently accomplished with a pelton wheel for high head, low flow water supply. The installation is often just a small dammed pool, at the top of a waterfall, with several hundred feet of pipe leading to a small generator housing. In low head sites, generally water wheels and Archimedes' screws are used.

== Construction ==
Typical microhydro setup

Construction details of a microhydro plant are site-specific. Sometimes an existing mill-pond or other artificial reservoir is available and can be adapted for power production. In general, microhydro systems are made up of a number of components. The most important include the intake where water is diverted from the natural stream, river, or perhaps a waterfall. An intake structure such as a catch box is required to screen out floating debris and fish, using a screen or array of bars to keep out large objects. In temperate climates, this structure must resist ice as well. The intake may have a gate to allow the system to be dewatered for inspection and maintenance.

The intake is then brought through a canal and then forebay. The forebay is used for sediment holding. At the bottom of the system the water is tunneled through a pipeline (penstock) to the powerhouse building containing a turbine. The penstock builds up pressure from the water that has traveled downwards. In mountainous areas, access to the route of the penstock may provide considerable challenges. If the water source and turbine are far apart, the construction of the penstock may be the largest part of the costs of construction. At the turbine, a controlling valve is installed to regulate the flow and the speed of the turbine. The turbine converts the flow and pressure of the water to mechanical energy; the water emerging from the turbine returns to the natural watercourse along a tailrace channel. The turbine turns a generator, which is then connected to electrical loads; this might be directly connected to the power system of a single building in very small installations, or may be connected to a community distribution system for several homes or buildings.

Usually, microhydro installations do not have a dam and reservoir, like large hydroelectric plants have, relying on a minimal flow of water to be available year-round.

== Head and flow characteristics ==
Microhydro systems are typically set up in areas capable of producing up to 100 kilowatts of electricity. This can power a home or small business facility. This production range is calculated in terms of "head" and "flow". The higher each of these are, the more power available. Hydraulic head is the pressure measurement of water falling in a pipe expressed as a function of the vertical distance the water falls. This change in elevation is usually measured in feet or meters. A drop of at least 2 feet (0.61 m) is required or the system may not be feasible. When quantifying head, both gross and net head must be considered. Gross head approximates power accessibility through the vertical distance measurement alone whereas net head subtracts pressure lost due to friction in piping from the gross head. "Flow" is the actual quantity of water falling from a site and is usually measured in gallons per minute, cubic feet per second, or liters per second. Low flow/high head installations in steep terrain have significant pipe costs. A long penstock starts with low pressure pipe at the top and progressively higher pressure pipe closer to the turbine in order to reduce pipe costs.

The available power, in kilowatts, from such a system can be calculated by the equation P=Q*H/k, where Q is the flow rate in gallons per minute, H is the static head, and k is a constant of 5,310 gal*ft/min*kW. For instance, for a system with a flow of 500 gallons per minute and a static head of 60 feet, the theoretical maximum power output is 5.65 kW. The system is prevented from 100% efficiency (from obtaining all 5.65 kW) due to the real world, such as: turbine efficiency, friction in pipe, and conversion from potential to kinetic energy. Turbine efficiency is generally between 50–80%, and pipe friction is accounted for using the Hazen–Williams equation.

== Regulation and operation ==
Typically, an automatic controller operates the turbine inlet valve to maintain constant speed (and frequency) when the load changes on the generator. In a system connected to a grid with multiple sources, the turbine control ensures that power always flows out from the generator to the system. The frequency of the alternating current generated needs to match the local standard utility frequency. In some systems, if the useful load on the generator is not high enough, a load bank may be automatically connected to the generator to dissipate energy not required by the load; while this wastes energy, it may be required if it is not possible to control the water flow through the turbine.

An induction generator always operates at the grid frequency irrespective of its rotation speed; all that is necessary is to ensure that it is driven by the turbine faster than the synchronous speed so that it generates power rather than consuming it. Other types of generator can use a speed control systems for frequency matching.

With the availability of modern power electronics it is often easier to operate the generator at an arbitrary frequency and feed its output through an inverter which produces output at grid frequency. Power electronics now allow the use of permanent magnet alternators that produce wild AC to be stabilised. This approach allows low speed / low head water turbines to be competitive; they can run at the best speed for extraction of energy, and the power frequency is controlled by the electronics instead of the generator.

Very small installations (pico hydro), a few kilowatts or smaller, may generate direct current and charge batteries for peak use times.

== Turbine types ==
Several types of water turbines can be used in micro hydro installations, selection depending on the head of water, the volume of flow, and such factors as availability of local maintenance and transport of equipment to the site. For hilly regions where a waterfall of 50 meters or more may be available, a Pelton wheel can be used. For low head installations, Francis or propeller-type turbines are used. Very low head installations of only a few meters may use propeller-type turbines in a pit, or water wheels and Archimedes screws. Small micro hydro installations may successfully use industrial centrifugal pumps, run in reverse as prime movers; while the efficiency may not be as high as a purpose-built runner, the relatively low cost makes the projects economically feasible.

In low-head installations, maintenance and mechanism costs can be relatively high. A low-head system moves larger amounts of water, and is more likely to encounter surface debris. For this reason a Banki turbine also called Ossberger turbine, a pressurized self-cleaning crossflow waterwheel, is often preferred for low-head micro hydro systems. Though less efficient, its simpler structure is less expensive than other low-head turbines of the same capacity. Since the water flows in, then out of it, it cleans itself and is less prone to jam with debris.

- Screw turbine (Reverse Archimedes' screw): two low-head schemes in England, Settle Hydro and Torrs Hydro use an Archimedes' screw which is another debris-tolerant design. Efficiency 85%.
- Gorlov: the Gorlov helical turbine free stream or constrained flow with or without a dam,
- Francis and propeller turbines.
- Kaplan turbine: Is a high flow, low head, propeller-type turbine. An alternative to the traditional kaplan turbine is a large diameter, slow turning, permanent magnet, sloped open flow VLH turbine with efficiencies of 90%.
- Water wheel: advanced hydraulic water wheels and hydraulic wheel-part reaction turbine can have hydraulic efficiencies of 67% and 85% respectively. Overshot water wheel maximum efficiency (hydraulic efficiency) is 85%. Undershot water wheels can operate with very low head, but also have efficiencies below 30%.
- Gravitation water vortex power plant: part of the river flow at a weir or natural water fall is diverted into a round basin with a central bottom exit that creates a vortex. A simple rotor (and connected generator) is moved by the kinetic energy. Efficiencies of 83% down to 64% at 1/3 part flow.

== Use ==
Microhydro systems are very flexible and can be deployed in a number of different environments. They are dependent on how much water flow the source (creek, river, stream) has and the velocity of the flow of water. Energy can be stored in battery banks at sites that are far from a facility or used in addition to a system that is directly connected so that in times of high demand there is additional reserve energy available. These systems can be designed to minimize community and environmental impact regularly caused by large dams or other mass hydroelectric generation sites.

=== Potential for rural development ===
Micro hydro systems have uses in rural development as their simplicity and low relative cost can help bring electricity to isolated communities. With only a small stream needed, remote areas can access lighting and communications for homes, medical clinics, schools, and other facilities. Micro hydro can also directly power machinery for small businesses, such as rice mills. Regions along the Andes mountains and in Sri Lanka and China already have active programs in micro hydro. Another benefit of such systems in some areas is to keep young community members from moving into more urban regions, supporting local economic growth. Micro hydro systems may also become more appealing in the future if financial incentives for less carbon-intensive power generation grow.

== Cost ==
The cost of a micro hydro plant can be US$1,000–5,000 per kW installed.

== Advantages and disadvantages ==
=== Advantages ===
Microhydro power is generated through a process that utilizes the natural flow of water. This power is most commonly converted into electricity. With no direct emissions resulting from this conversion process, there are little to no harmful effects on the environment, if planned well, thus supplying power from a renewable source and in a sustainable manner. Microhydro is considered a "run-of-river" system meaning that water diverted from the stream or river is redirected back into the same watercourse. Adding to the potential economic benefits of microhydro is efficiency, reliability, and cost effectiveness.

=== Disadvantages ===
Microhydro systems are limited mainly by the characteristics of the site. The most direct limitation comes from small sources with the minuscule flow. Likewise, flow can fluctuate seasonally in some areas. Lastly, though perhaps the foremost disadvantage is the distance from the power source to the site in need of energy. This distributional issue as well as the others are key when considering using a micro-hydro system.

== See also ==
- Small hydro up to 10,000 kW
- Pico hydro up to 5 kW
- Hydropower
- Renewable energy
- Sustainable energy
- Water wheels
- Vortex power
- Gravitation water vortex power
