= Grid-tie inverter =

Electrical equipment

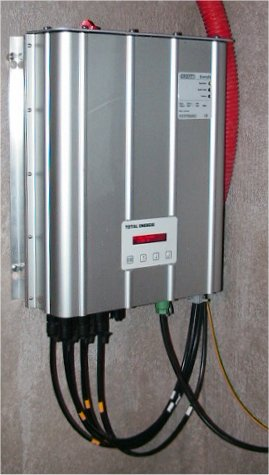
Inverter for grid-tied solar panel

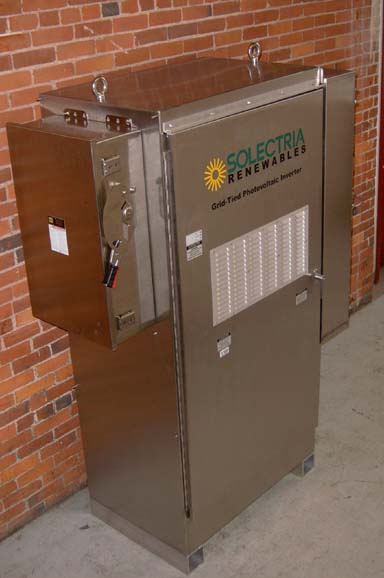
Three-phase grid-tie inverter for large solar panel systems

A grid-tie inverter converts direct current (DC) into an alternating current (AC) suitable for injecting into an electrical power grid, at the same voltage and frequency of that power grid. Grid-tie inverters are used between local electrical power generators: solar panel, wind turbine, hydro-electric, and the grid.

To inject electrical power efficiently and safely into the grid, grid-tie inverters must accurately match the voltage, frequency and phase of the grid sine wave AC waveform.

== Payment for injected power ==
Electricity companies, in some countries, pay for electrical power that is injected into the electricity utility grid. Payment is arranged in several ways.

With net metering the electricity company pays for the net power injected into the grid, as recorded by a meter on the customer's premises. For example, a customer may consume 400 kilowatt-hours over a month and may return 500 kilowatt-hours to the grid in the same month. In this case the electricity company would pay for the 100 kilowatt hours balance of power fed back into the grid. In the US, net metering policies vary by jurisdiction.

Feed-in tariff, based on a contract with a distribution company or other power authority, is where the customer is paid for electrical power injected into the grid.

In the United States, grid-interactive power systems are specified in the National Electrical Code (NEC), which also mandates requirements for grid-interactive inverters.

== Operation ==
Grid-tie inverters convert DC electrical power into AC power suitable for injecting into the electric utility company grid. The grid tie inverter (GTI) must match the phase of the grid and maintain the output voltage slightly higher than the grid voltage at any instant. A high-quality modern grid-tie inverter has a fixed unity power factor, which means its output voltage and current are perfectly lined up, and its phase angle is within 1° of the AC power grid. The inverter has an internal computer that senses the current AC grid waveform, and outputs a voltage to correspond with the grid. However, supplying reactive power to the grid might be necessary to keep the voltage in the local grid inside allowable limits.

Grid-tie inverters are designed to disconnect quickly from the grid if the utility grid goes down. In the United States, there is an NEC requirement that in the event of a blackout, the grid tie inverter shut down to prevent the electricity it generates from harming persons repairing the power grid.

Properly configured, a grid tie inverter enables a building to use an alternative power generation system such as solar or wind power without extensive rewiring and without batteries. If the system produces insufficient power, the utility grid makes up the deficit.

== Types ==
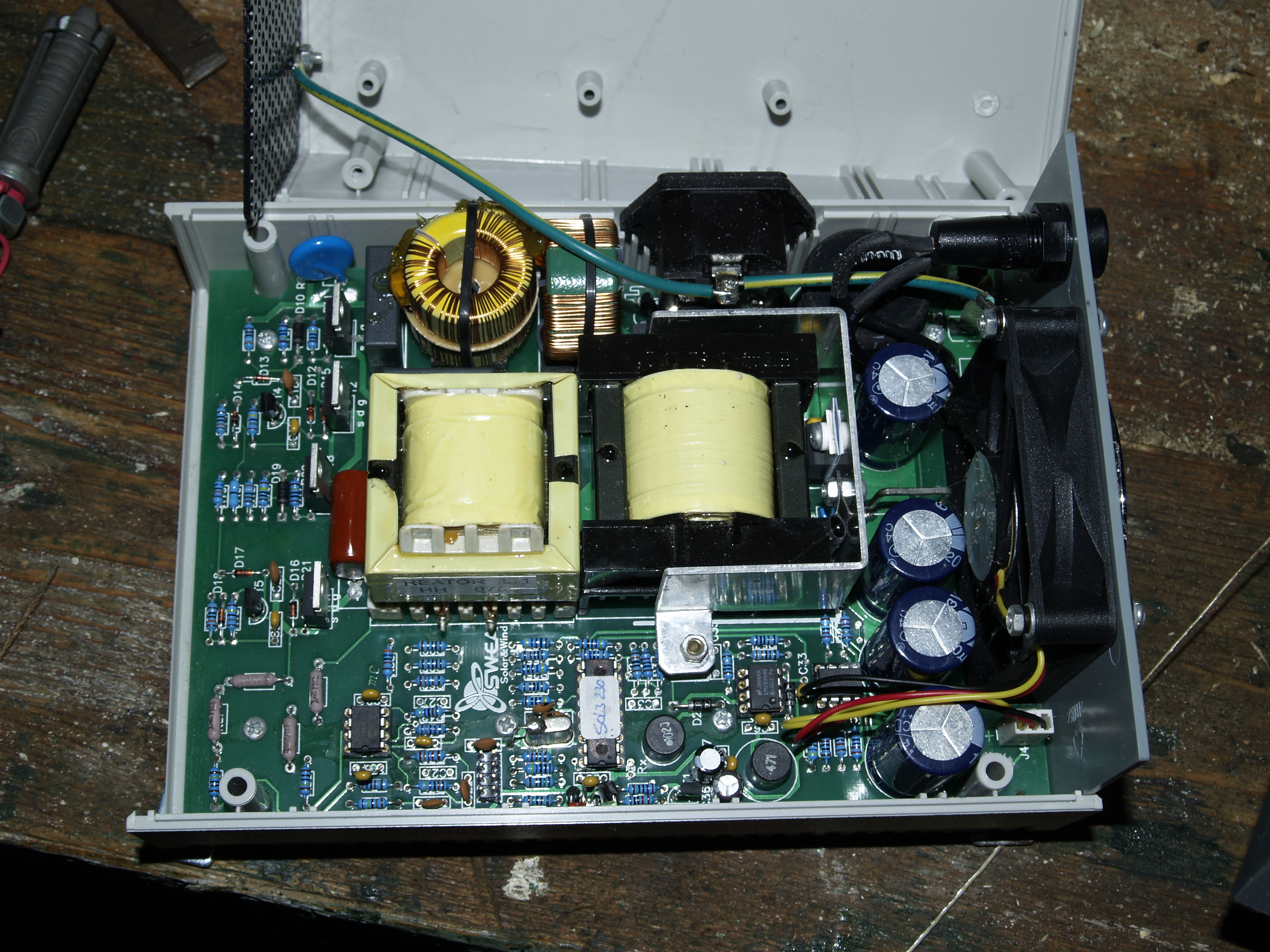
Inside an SWEA 250 W transformer-coupled grid-tie inverter

Grid-tie inverters include conventional low-frequency types with transformer coupling, newer high-frequency types, also with transformer coupling, and transformerless types. Instead of converting direct current directly into AC suitable for the grid, high-frequency transformers types use a computer process to convert the power to a high-frequency and then back to DC and then to the final AC output voltage suitable for the grid.

Transformerless inverters, which are popular in Europe, are lighter, smaller, and more efficient than inverters with transformers. But transformerless inverters have been slow to enter the US market because of concerns that transformerless inverters, which do not have galvanic isolation between the DC side and grid, could inject dangerous DC voltages and currents into the grid under fault conditions.

However, since 2005, the NFPA's NEC allows transformerless, or non-galvanically isolated, inverters by removing the requirement that all solar electric systems be negative grounded and specifying new safety requirements. Amendments to VDE 0126-1-1 and IEC 6210 define the design and procedures needed for such systems: primarily, ground current measurement and DC to grid isolation tests.

== Datasheets ==
Manufacturers datasheets for their inverters usually include the following data:

- Rated output power: This value is provided in watts or kilowatts. For some inverters, they may provide an output rating for different output voltages. For instance, if the inverter can be configured for either 240 VAC or 208 VAC output, the rated power output may be different for each of those configurations.
- Output voltage(s): This value indicates the utility voltages the inverter can connect to. For smaller inverters for residential use, the output voltage is usually 240 VAC. Inverters that target commercial applications are available for 208, 240, 277, 400, 480 or 600 VAC and may also produce three phase power.
- Peak efficiency: The peak efficiency represents the highest efficiency that the inverter can achieve. Most grid-tie inverters on the market as of July 2009 have peak efficiencies of over 94%, some as high as 96%. The energy lost during inversion is for the most part converted into heat. Consequently, for an inverter to output its rated power it must have a power input that exceeds its output. For example, a 5000 W inverter operating at full power at 95% efficiency requires an input of 5,263 W (rated power divided by efficiency). Inverters that are capable of producing power at different AC voltages may have different efficiencies associated with each voltage.
- CEC weighted efficiency: This efficiency is published by the California Energy Commission on its GoSolar website. In contrast to peak efficiency, this value is an average efficiency and is a better representation of the inverter's operating profile. Inverters that are capable of producing power at different AC voltages may have different efficiencies associated with each voltage.
- Maximum input current: This is the maximum amount of direct current that the inverter can use. If a system, solar cells for example, produces a current in excess of the maximum input current, that current is not used by the inverter.
- Maximum output current: The maximum output current is the maximum continuous alternating current that the inverter can supply. This value is typically used to determine the minimum current rating of the over-current protection devices (e.g., breakers and fuses) and disconnects required for the output circuit. Inverters that can produce power at different AC voltages have different maximum outputs for each voltage.
- Peak power tracking voltage: This represents the DC voltage range in which the inverter's maximum point power tracker operates. The system designer must configure the strings optimally so that during the majority of the year, the voltage of the strings are within this range. This can be a difficult task since voltage fluctuates with temperature changes.
- Start voltage: This value is not listed on all inverter datasheets. The value indicates the minimum DC voltage required for the inverter to turn on and operate. This is especially important for solar applications, because the system designer must be sure that there is a sufficient number of solar modules wired in series in each string to produce this voltage. If this value is not provided by the manufacturer, system designers typically use the lower band of the peak power tracking voltage range as the inverter's minimum voltage.
- IPxx rating: The Ingress Protection rating or IP Code classifies and rates the level of protection provided against the ingress of solid foreign objects (first digit) or water (second digit), a higher digit means greater protection. In the US the NEMA enclosure type is used similarly to the international rating. Most inverters are rated for outdoors installation with IP45 (no dust protection) or IP65 (dust tight), or in the US, NEMA 3R (no windblown dust protection) or NEMA 4X (windblown dust, direct water splash and additional corrosion protection).
- Certifications/Compliance: Certifications required by electric utilities and local electric codes for grid tie approval such as UL 1741 and emerging standard UL 1741SA

== See also ==
- Grid-tied electrical system
- Inverter (electrical)
- Islanding
- Soft-switching three-level inverter
- Solar inverter
- Stand-alone inverter
- Tesla Powerwall
