= List of energy abbreviations =

This is a list of acronyms found in the context of energy issues.

== A ==
- AAQS—Ambient Air Quality Standards (environment) (US)
- AAU—assigned amount units (measurement)
- ABT—availability-based tariff (electricity)
- ABF—Aquatic base flow (hydropower) (electricity)
- AC—alternating current
- ACA—Annual charge adjustment (electricity)
- ACE—Area control error (electricity)
- ACEEE—American Council for an Energy-Efficient Economy
- ACRS—Accelerated Cost Recovery System (finance)
- ADITC—Accumulated Deferred Investment Tax Credit (policy)
- ADR—asset depreciation range (finance)
- AEP—American Electric Power (electricity)
- AESO—Alberta Electric System Operator
- AFE—Authority for Expenditure or Authorization for Expenditure
- AFUDC—allowance for funds used during construction
- AFV—alternative fuel vehicle
- AGA—American Gas Association
- AGC—automatic generation control
- AGD—Associated Gas Distributors (US)
- AI—Artificial Intelligence
- AIEE—American Institute of Electrical Engineers
- AIMA—Agricultural Impact Mitigation Agreement (US)
- ALARP—as low as reasonably practicable
- ALJ—administrative law judge
- AMBO—Armenia, Macedonia, Bulgaria Oil pipeline
- AMI—advanced metering infrastructure
- AMR—automated meter reading also known as automatic meter reading
- AMRA—Automatic Meter Reading Association
- ANGTA—Alaskan Natural Gas Transportation Act of 1977 to build the Alaska gas pipeline
- ANGTS—Alaskan Natural Gas Transportation System
- ANSI—American National Standards Institute
- AOB—Any Other Business
- AOS—authorized overrun service
- AP—action point
- APA—Administrative Procedure Act
  - —Alaska Power Administration
- APE—area of potential effect (electricity)
- API—American Petroleum Institute (oil)
- APPA—American Public Power Association (electricity)
- APR—actual peak reduction (e.g. in demand response systems) (electricity)
- AQCR—Air Quality Control Region (US) (environment)
- AR—Activity Request
- ARA—(in shipping) ports of Amsterdam – Rotterdam – Antwerp (oil)
- ARR—auction revenue rights (electricity)
- ASCC—Alaskan System Coordination Council
- ASE—Alliance to Save Energy
- ASTM—American Society for Testing and Materials
- ATC—available transfer capability
- AVR—automatic voltage regulator (electricity)

== B ==
- BA—balancing authority
- BA—biological assessment
- BACT—Best Available Control Technology
- BBL/D—Barrel per day
- BBL/SD—Barrel per day, on stream days
- BBL—barrel (42 gallons)
  - —Balgzand Bacton Line (BBL Pipeline)
- BCD—Barrel per day, on calendar days
- BCF—billion cubic feet
- BCP—Blackstart Capability Plan
- BES—Bulk electric system (Electricity transmission)
- BESS—Battery Energy Storage System
- BfP—Bureau Fédéral du Plan (Belgium). (Has responsibilities over economic, social and environmental policy
- bhp—Brake horsepower
- BIA—Bureau of Indian Affairs (US)
- BIPS—Bulk Independent Power System
- BIPV—Building Integrated Photo Voltaic
- bl—Barrel
- BLM—Bureau of Land Management of United States Department of the Interior
- BLS—Bureau of Labor Statistics of United States Department of Labor
- BOE—Barrel of oil equivalent (international)
- BPA—Bonneville Power Administration (US)
- BPCS—Basic Process Control System
- BPL—Broadband over power line
- BPS—Bulk Power System (Electricity transmission)
- BTMG—Behind The Meter Generation
- BTU—British thermal unit(s)
- BTU—Board of Trade unit (1 kWh) (UK historical)
- BTX—from BTX process, a mixture of benzene, toluene, and xylene (oil)
- BuRec—United States Bureau of Reclamation (government)
- BWR—Boiling water reactor (nuclear)

== C ==
- C&I—Commercial and industrial customers (Electricity transmission)
- CA—Carbon Abatement- increasing carbon-neutrality
  - —Control area (EU) – The portion of the generation and transmission system controlled by a single transmission system operator. (See also TSO).
- CAA—Clean Air Act (US)
- CAEM—Center for the Advancement of Energy Markets (US)
- CAES—Compressed Air Energy Storage
- CAFE—Corporate Average Fuel Economy standards (US)
- CAISO—California Independent System Operator Corporation, a regional transmission organization. (US)
- CAM—Compact Auxiliary Module
- CAP—Capacity market programs
  - —Climate Action Plan
- CAPM—Capital asset pricing model
- CARB—California Air Resources Board
- CBL—Customer Baseline Load
- CBM—Capacity Benefit Margin
- CBOB—Conventional Gasoline Blendstock for Oxygenate Blending (Motor Gasoline Blending Component)
- CC—Combined cycle see also CCPP and CCGT
- CCB—Change Control Board
- CCF—Common Cause Failure
- CCGT—Combined cycle gas turbine electricity generator
- CCLIP—Conditional Credit Line for Investment Projects
- CCN—Certificate of Convenience and Necessity (utilities regulation)
- CCPG—Colorado Coordinated Planning Group
- CCPP—Combined cycle power plant
- CD—Contract Demand
- CDD—Cooling degree day, a qualitative index used to reflect the demand for energy to cool a business
- CDM—Clean Development Mechanism
- CDR—Carbon dioxide removal
- CEA—Country Environmental Analysis
- CEC—California Energy Commission
  - —Commission for Environmental Cooperation
  - —Council of the European Communities
- CEEC—Central and Eastern European Countries
- CEMS—Continuous emissions monitoring system
- CEP—Country Environmental Profile
  - —Clean Energy Partnership, a joint hydrogen-project in Europe.
- CEPS—Centre for European Policy Studies
- CEPII—Centre d'Etudes Prospectives et d'Informations Internationales Economics think tank
- CEQ—Council on Environmental Quality
- CER—Certified Emission Reduction
- CERA—Cambridge Energy Research Associates
- CERCLA—Comprehensive Environmental Response, Compensation, and Liability Act "Superfund" (US)
- CERCLIS—Comprehensive Environmental Response, Compensation, and Liability Information System (US)
- CERTS—Consortium for Electric Reliability Technology Solutions sponsored by the United States Department of Energy and California Energy Commission (US)
- CfD—Contract for difference
- CFS—cubic feet per second
- CFTC—Commodity Futures Trading Commission
- CGR—Charge Gas Recirculation, Compact Gas Ramp (like FGSU)
- CH_{4}—Methane
- CHP—Combined heat and power
- CI—Configuration Item
- CIAC—Contributions in Aid of Construction
- CIP—Critical Infrastructure Protection (US)
  - —see also EPCIP European Programme for Critical Infrastructure Protection
- CMVE—Competitive Market Value Estimate
- CNG—Compressed natural gas
- CO—Carbon monoxide
- CO_{2}—Carbon dioxide
- COC—Cost of capital
- COE—U.S. Army Corps of Engineers
- COTS—Commercial Off-The-Shelf
- CP—Coincident Peak
  - —Certificate Proceeding
- CPA—California Power Authority
- CPI—Consumer Price Index
- CPP—Critical Peak Pricing
- CPP-F—Critical peak fixed
- CPP-F—Critical peak variable
- CPS—Control Performance Standard
  - —Cycles per second (hertz)
- CPUC—California Public Utilities Commission
- CR—Change Request
- CREF—Caribbean Renewable Energy Facility
- CRP—Conservation Reserve Program (US)
- CRT—Capacity Reservation Tariff
- CSD—Commission for Sustainable Development (UN)
- CSEM—Center for the Study of Energy Markets (US)
- CSP—Country Strategy Paper
  - —Curtailment service provider
- CT—Combustion turbine (electricity)
- CW—Cooling Water
- CZMA—Coastal Zone Management Act

== D ==
- DADRP—Day Ahead Demand Response Program
- DADS—Demand response Availability Data System
- DANIDA—Danish International Development Agency
- DA-RTP—RTP Day ahead real time pricing (regarding Electricity metering)
- DC—Direct current
- DCLM—Direct control load management
- DCS—Disturbance Control Standard
- DD—Dangerous Detected
- DEFG—Distributed Energy Financial Group (US)
- DEIS—Draft Environmental Impact Statement (US)
- DER—Distributed Energy Resources
- DERMS—Distributed Energy Resource Management Systems
- DF—Distribution Factor, Dual-Fuel
- DG—Distributed generation (electricity)
  - —Directorate-General (EU) (government)
- DIIS—Danish Institute for International Studies (organization)
- DLC—Direct load control (regarding Load management)
- DME—Disturbance Monitoring Equipment
- DO—Dissolved oxygen
- DoD—Depth of discharge, energy drawn from a battery
- DOE—United States Department of Energy (government)
- DOE/FE—United States Department of Energy Office of Fossil Energy (government)
- DOI—United States Department of the Interior (government)
- DOT—United States Department of Transportation (government)
- DP—Distribution point
- DPI—Differential Pressure Indicator
- DR—Demand response
- DRAM—Demand Response and Advanced Metering Coalition
- DRB—Demonstrated reserve base
- DRCC—Demand Response Coordinating Council (coalition)
- DRR—Demand Response resources
- DRRC—Demand Response Research Center (California)
- DSM—Demand side management
- DSO—Distribution system operator (regarding electricity distribution)
- Dth—Dekatherm (defined as 1 million British thermal units, also written "MMBtu") (measurement)
- DTW—dealer tank wagon (as in, "oil companies setting regional dealer tank wagon pricing") (Oil)
- DU—Dangerous Undetected

== E ==
- E&D—Exploration and development expenses
- E/E/PE—Electrical/Electronic/Programmable Electronic
- E85—E85 fuel: A fuel containing a mixture of 85 percent ethanol and 15 percent gasoline
- E95—like E85 fuel but with less gasoline. A fuel containing a mixture of 95 percent ethanol and 5 percent gasoline
- EA—Environmental assessment as in an Environmental impact assessment
- EAR—Estimated additional resources, as in considering reserves of uranium deposits
- EC—European Commission
- ECAR—East Central Area Reliability Coordination Agreement (US)
- EPCIP—European Programme for Critical Infrastructure Protection
- ECPA—Electric Consumers Protection Act (US)
- EDC—Electric Distribution Company (electricity)
- EdF—Electricité de France
- EDRP—Emergency demand response program
- EE—Energy efficiency
- EEI—Edison Electric Institute
  - —Energy Efficiency Index for European Union energy labels
- EEQ—Engineered Equipment
- EERS—Energy Efficiency Resource Standards
- EF—Earth Fault
- EGHE—Exhaust Gas Heat Exchanger
- EHV—Extra high voltage
- EIA—Energy Information Administration (US)
  - —Environmental impact assessment (international)
- EIB—European Investment Bank
- EIM—Energy Imbalance Market (electricity)
- EIPP—Eastern Interconnection Phasor Project
- EIS—Environmental Impact Statement (US)
- ELCON—Electricity Consumers Resources Council
- EMF—Electro magnetic field
- EMP—Environmental Management Plan
- EOR—Enhanced oil recovery
- EPA—United States Environmental Protection Agency
- EPAct—Energy Policy Act of 1992 (US)
  - —Energy Policy Act of 2005 (US)
- EPC—Engineering, Procurement and Construction
- EPRI—Electric Power Research Institute (US)
- EPSA—Electric Power Supply Association
- EQR—Electric Quarterly Report
- ERA—Economic Regulatory Administration (part of United States Department of Energy
- ERCOT—Electric Reliability Council of Texas, Inc, a regional transmission organization. (US)
- ERGEG—European Regulators Group for Electricity and Gas
- ERIS—Energy Resource Interconnection Service (electricity)
- ERO—Electric Reliability Organization. The US designated NERC as its ERO.
- ERoEI—Energy returned on energy invested
- ERRA—Energy Regulators Regional Association
- ESCO—Energy service company
- ESI—Environmental Sustainability Index
- ESMAP—Energy Sector Management Assistance Programme
- ESM—Engine Safety Module
- ESP—Electrostatic precipitator
- ESS—Energy Storage System, as in grid energy storage (electricity)
- ETBE—ethyl tertiary butyl ether
- ETSO—European Transmission System Operators association
- EU—European Union
- EUC—Equipment Under Control
- EUEF—European Union Energy Facility
- EUEI—European Union Energy Initiative

== F ==
- FAC—Fuel Adjustment Clause
- FACTS—Flexible Alternating Current Transmission System
- FASB—Financial Accounting Standards Board
- FAT—Factory Acceptance Testing
- FBD—Function(al) Block Diagram
- FBR—fast breeder reactor
- FCITC—First Contingency Incremental Transfer Capability
- FE—Final Element
- FEIS—Final Environmental impact statement (US)
- FELCC—Firm Energy Load Carrying Capability
- FERA—Fire and Explosion Risk Assessment
- FERC—Federal Energy Regulatory Commission (U.S.)
- FG—Fuel Gas
- FGD—Flue-gas desulfurization
- FGSU—Fuel Gas Supply Unit (like CGR)
- FINESSE—Financing Energy Services for Small Scale Users
- Fishway—Fish ladder
- FLD—Functional Logic Diagram
- FLPMA—Federal Land Policy and Management Act (US)
- FME—Free market economics
- FMEA—Failure Modes and Effects Analysis
- FONSI—Finding of no significant impact. See Environmental impact statement (US)
- FPA—Federal Power Act (US)
- FPC—Federal Power Commission (US)
- FPL—Fixed Program Language
- FPS—Firm peaking service. See Peaking power plant
- FRCC—Florida Reliability Coordinating Council (US)
- FRS—Financial Reporting System
- FS—Functional Safety
- FSA—Functional Safety Assessment
- FSD—Functional Safety Deliverable(s)
- FSM—Functional Safety Management, Functional Safety Manager
- FSMS—Functional Safety Management System
- FT—Firm Transportation Service
- FTA—Fault Tree Analysis
- FTC—Federal Trade Commission (US)
- FTR—Firm Transmission Rights
  - —Financial Transmission Rights. See explanation in electricity markets.
- FTS—Firm transportation service
- FUA—The Fuel Use Act (US)
- FUCO—Foreign Utility Company
- FVL—Full Variability Language
- FWPA—Federal Water Power Act (US)

== G ==
- G&T—Generation and transmission utility cooperative (electricity)
- GADS—Generating Availability Data System (electricity)
- GAL—gallon (measurement)
- GAO—Government Accountability Office (General Accounting Office) (US) (government)
- GATT—General Agreement on Tariffs and Trade (government)
- GCB—Generator Circuit Breaker
- GDP—gross domestic product (economics)
- GEF—Global Environmental Facility (environment)
- Genco—Any company doing electricity generation (US) (electricity)
- GFN—Global Footprint Network
- GFSE—Global Forum on Sustainable Energy (organization)
- GIC—Gross Inland (energy) Consumption (EU) (energy)
- GHG—Greenhouse gas (climate)
- GIA—Generator Interconnection Agreement (electricity)
- GIC—Gas Inventory Charge (natural gas)
- GISB—Gas Industry Standards Board (now NAESB) (US) (natural gas)
- GLDF—Generator to Load Distribution Factor. See Load balancing (electricity)
- Gm^{3}—Billion cubic metres (measurement – gas)
- GMO—Genetically modified organism
- GMP—Green Mountain Power (US) (electricity)
- GNP—gross national product (economics)
- GNSED—Global Network for Sustainable Energy Development
- GRI—Gas Research Institute (US) (natural gas)
- GRC—General rate case (US) (regulatory)
- GridCo—Any company running a transmission grid (electricity). Also known as a TransCo (US) (electricity)
- GSF—Generator to Load Distribution Factor. See Load balancing (electricity)
- GPE—gravitational potential energy
- GPRS—Gas Pressure Reduction System
- GSR—Gas Supply Realignment (natural gas)
- Gt—Gigaton (1 billion tons) (measurement)
- Gtc—GCB (Generator Circuit Breaker) trip circuit
- GTCC—Gas Turbine Combined Cycle (electricity)
- GTI—Gas Technology Institute (US)
- Gtoe—One billion tons of oil equivalent(EU) (measurement- oil)
- GVEP—Global Village Energy Partnership (organization)
- GVW—gross vehicle weight (transportation)
- GW—Gigawatt (one billion watts) (measurement- elect)
- GWE—Gigawatt of electric energy (measurement- elect)
- GWh—Gigawatt hour (one billion watt hours) (measurement- elect)
- GWP—global warming potential (climate)

== H ==
- H&RA—Hazard And Risk Analysis
- HAZID—Hazard Identification
- HAZOP—Hazard And Operability Study
- HCA—Host Control Area (electricity)
- HDD—Heating degree days a qualitative index used to reflect the demand for energy to heat a business (conservation)
- HERS—Home energy rating standard (conservation)
- HHI—Herfindahl–Hirschman Index (markets)
- HID—high intensity discharge (electricity)
- HMI—Human Machine Interface
- hp—Horsepower (measurement)
- HRSG—Heat recovery steam generation
- HS—Hardware Safety proof test frequency
- HTGR—high temperature gas cooled reactor (nuclear)
- HVAC—Heating, ventilation, and air conditioning (conservation)
  - —High voltage alternating current (electricity)
- HVAR—Highly Valued Aquatic Resource
- HVDC—High Voltage Direct Current

== I ==
- I/C—Interruptible /Curtailable (electricity)
- ICAP—Installed Capacity (electricity)
- ICAP-SCR—Installed capacity special case resources (electricity)
- ICCP—Inter-Control Center Communications Protocol (electricity)
- ICE—Internal combustion engine (transportation)
- ICT—Independent Coordinator of Transmission (US) (electricity)
  - —Information and Communication Technology
- IDC—Interchange Distribution Calculator (electricity)
- IEA—International Energy Agency (Paris)
- IEC—International Electrotechnical Commission
- IEM—Internal electricity market (electricity)
- IEEE—Institute of Electrical and Electronics Engineers
- IEPE—Institute of Energy Policy and Economics (France)
- IER—Incremental Energy Rate
- IET—International emission trading (policy)
- IGCC—Integrated coal gasification combined cycle
- IGIC—Interim gas inventory charge (natural gas)
- IGSC—Interim gas supply charge (natural gas)
- IGT—Institute of Gas Technology (natural gas)
- IGU—International Gas Union (natural gas)
- IHR—Incremental Heat Rate- plant monitoring (electricity)
- IIASA—International Institute for Applied System Analysis
- IJC—International Joint Commission
- ILP—Integrated Licensing Process
- INGAA—Interstate Natural Gas Association of America
- IOS—Interconnected Operations Services (electricity)
- IOU—Investor owned utility (electricity)
- IPAA—Independent Petroleum Association of America (oil)
- IPCC—Intergovernmental Panel on Climate Change (climate)
- IPF—Independent Protection Function
- IPL—Independent Protection Layer
- IPP—Independent Power Producer (electricity)
- IPS/UPS—Integrated Power System/United Power System, consisting of Independent Power Systems of 12 countries bordering Russia and the Unified Power System of Russia
- IRC—ISO / RTO Council (electricity)
- IROL—Interconnection Reliability Operating Limit (electricity)
- IRP—Integrated resource planning
- IRR—Internal Rate of Return (finance)
- ISO—Independent System Operator (US) (see also TSO) Responsible for grid management, but does not own assets. (electricity)
- ISO-NE—Independent System Operator of New England, a regional transmission organization. (US) (electricity)
- ISO—NE ISO New England, Inc. (electricity)
- ISS—Interruptible Sales Service
- IT—Interruptible Transportation is gas shipment via pipeline whose delivery may be interrupted in favor of "firm shipment" contracts if there is lack of capacity. (natural gas)
- ITC—Investment tax credit (policy)
- ITS—"Interruptible Transportation Service" is gas shipment via pipeline whose delivery may be interrupted in favor of "firm shipment" contracts if there is lack of capacity. (natural gas)

== J ==
- JRC—Joint Research Centre
- JREC—Johannesburg Renewable Energy Coalition

== K ==
- koe—One kilogram oil equivalent (EU) (measurement)
- KPI—Key Performance Indicator
- kV—Kilovolt (one thousand volts) (measurement)
- kVA—One thousand volt Ampere (measurement)
- kvar—one thousand vars (measurement)
- kW—Kilowatt (one thousand watts) (measurement)
- kWE—kilowatt electric (measurement)
- kWh—Kilowatt hour (one thousand watt hours) (measurement)

== L ==
- LaaR—Load acting as a resource (ERCOT category) (electricity)
- LBA—Local Balancing Authority (electricity)
- LBNL—Lawrence Berkeley National Laboratory (US)
- LCOD—Levelized cost of delivery (electricity)
- LCOE—Levelized cost of energy (electricity)
- LCOS—Levelized cost of storage (electricity)
- LDC—Local distribution company (electricity)
- LE—Latest Estimate
- LED—Light Emitting Diode
- LEL—Lower Explosion Limit
- LEVP—Low Emissions Vehicle Program
- LHV—lower heating value
- Li-Ion—Lithium Ion (electricity storage)
- LIHEAP—Low Income Home Energy Assistance Program
- LIPA—Long Island Power Authority (US) (electricity)
- LLF—Load-loss factor (electricity)
- LMP—Locational marginal price/pricing. See explanation in electricity markets.
- LMR—Load Modifying Resource (electricity)
- LNG—Liquified Natural Gas
- LO—Lube Oil
- LOC—Lube Oil Cooler
- LODF—Line Outage Distribution Factor (electricity)
- LOLE—Loss of load expectation (electricity)
- LOLP—Loss of load probability (electricity)
- LOPA—Layer of Protection Analysis
- LOTO—Lockout / tagout.
- LPG—liquefied petroleum gas
- LPN—Lender Participation Notes
- LRG—liquefied refinery gases
- LSE—Load serving entity
- LSF—Load Shift Factor
- lsfo—Low sulfur fuel oil
- LVL—Limited Variability Language
- LWR—light water reactor

== M ==
- MAAC—Mid Atlantic Area Council (US- geographically within PJM)
- MADRI—Mid Atlantic Distributed Resources Initiative (US)
- MAIN—Mid America Interconnected Network (US)
- MAOP—Maximum allowable operating pressure
- MAPP—Mid Continent Area Power Pool (US)
- MBD—million barrels per day
- MBOE—One million barrels of oil equivalent(EU)
- MBR—Market based Rates
- MBS—Macro economic Budget Support
- MBU—Main Breaker Unit
- Mcf—Roman numeral "M" for one thousand cubic feet (measurement of natural gas)
- MDAS—Meter Data Acquisition System
- MDD—Maximum Daily Delivery Obligations
- MDDQ—Maximum Daily Delivery Quantity
- MDM—Meter Data Management
- MDQ—Maximum Daily Quantities
- MECS—Manufacturing Energy Consumption Survey
- MEDREG—Mediterranean Energy Regulators
- MEDREP—Mediterranean Renewables Energy Partnership
- MER—Maximum efficient rate
- MERC—Mobile Emission Reduction Credit (MERC) (US)
- MFS—Minimum Functional Specification
- MFV—Modified fixed variable rate
- MISO—Midcontinent Independent System Operator, Inc. A regional transmission organization. (US)
- MLP—Maximum lawful price
- MLRA—Major Land Resource Areas
- MM—Used to denote million in gas usage
- MMbbl/d—one million barrels of oil per day
- MMBtu—1 million British thermal units, same as dekatherm
- MMC—Market Monitoring Center
- MMCF—one million cubic feet (measurement of natural gas)
- MMCFD—one million cubic feet per day
- MMGAL—one million gallons
- MMGAL/D—one million gallons per day
- MMS—Minerals Management Service (US)
- MMST—one million short tons
- MoC—Management of Change
- MODFLOW—model of groundwater flow
- MOU—Memorandum of Understanding
- MOX—mixed oxide fuel (nuclear)
- MPAN—Meter Point Administration Number
- MPG—Miles per gallon
- MRO—Midwest Reliability Organization (US)
- MRT—Mean Repair Time
- MSA—metropolitan statistical area
- MSHA—Mine Safety and Health Administration (US)
- msl—Mean sea level
- MSW—Municipal solid waste
- Mt—one million tons (ambiguous as to whether short tons or metric tons)
  - —one Metric ton
- MTBE—methyl tertiary butyl ether
- MTEF—Medium Term Expenditure Framework
- MTEP—Midwest ISO Transmission Expansion Plan 2005 (US)
- Mtoe—One million tons of oil equivalent(EU)
- MTTF—Mean Time To Failure
- MTTFd—Mean Time To dangerous Failure
- Muni—Municipality
- MVA—Megavolt amperes (one million volt amperes)
- MW—Megawatt (one million watts)
- MWE—megawatt electric
- MWh—Megawatt hour (one million watt hours)

== N ==
- NAAQS—National Ambient Air Quality Standards (US)
- NAESB—North American Energy Standards Board (formerly GISB)
- NAFTA—North American Free Trade Agreement
- NAICS—North American Industry Classification System
- NAP—National Renewable Energy Action Plan
- NARUC—National Association of Regulatory Utility Commissioners (US)
- NAS—United States National Academy of Sciences
- NASPI—North American Synchrophasor Initiative
- NASUCA—National Association of Utility Consumer Advocates(US)
- NATC—Non Recallable Available Transfer Capability
- NBS—National Bureau of Standards (US)
- NCD—Non coincidental Demand
- NCEP—National Council on Electricity Policy (US)
- NCSL—National Conference of State Legislatures (US)
- NEA—The National Energy Act of 1978 (US)
- NEB—National Energy Board (Canada)
- NEDRI—New England Distributed Resources Initiative (US)
- NEM—Net energy metering (US)
- NEPA—National Environmental Policy Act (US)
- NEPOOL—New England Power Pool
- NERC—North American Electric Reliability Council
- NGA—Natural Gas Act (US)
- NGAA—Natural Gasoline Association of America (US)
- NGL—natural gas liquids
- NGPA—Natural Gas Policy Act of 1978 (US)
- NGPL—Natural gas plant liquids
- NGPSA—Natural Gas Pipeline Safety Act of 1968 (US)
- NGSA—Natural Gas Supply Association (US)
- NGV—Natural gas vehicle
- NHPA—National Historic Preservation Act (US)
- NIETC—National Interest Electric Transmission Corridor (US)
- NITC—Normal Incremental Transfer Capability
- NIMBY—Not in my backyard regarding siting of energy generation and transmission infrastructure.
- NOAA—National Oceanic and Atmospheric Administration (US)
- NOC—National Oil Company
- NOI—Notice of Intent or Notice of Inquiry or Notice of Investigation
- NOPR—Notice of Proposed Rulemaking (US)
- NORDEL—association of Nordic electric system operators, comprising Denmark, Finland, Norway, Sweden
- NOx—nitrogen oxides
- NPCC—Northeast Power Coordinating Council (US)
- NPV—Net Present Value
- NRC—Nuclear Regulatory Commission (US)
- NRCS—National Resource Conservation Service (US)
- NRECA—National Association of Rural Electric Cooperatives (US)
- NREL—National Renewable Energy Laboratory (US)
- NREPA—National Resource and Environmental Protection Act (US)
- NRI—National Rivers Inventory (US)
- NRIS—Network Resource Interconnection Service (electricity)
- NSA—Noise sensitive area
- NTAC—Northwest Transmission Assessment Committee (US)
- NUG—Non Utility Generator
- NURE—national uranium resource evaluation (US)
- NYDER—New York Department of Environmental Resources
- NYISO—New York Independent System Operator, Inc. (US)
- NYMEX—New York Mercantile Exchange
- NYPSC—New York Public Service Commission
- NYSERDA—New York State Energy Research and Development Authority
- NIMYBY—Not In My BackYard

== O ==
- O&M—Operation and Maintenance Expenses
- O_{3}—Ozone
- OASIS—Open Access Same-Time Information System
- OATI—Open Access Technology International (US energy software company)
- OATT—Open Access Transmission Tariff (US)
- OCGT—Open Cycle Gas Turbine
- OCS—Outer Continental Shelf (oil and wind resources)
- OCSLA—Outer Continental Shelf Lands Act (oil)
- OECD—Organisation for Economic Co-operation and Development
- OEM—original equipment manufacturers
- OFO—Operational Flow Order
- OI—Order Intake
- OMP—Operation and Maintenance Plan
- Ontario—IESO Ontario Independent Electricity System Operator (Canada)
- OPEC—Organization of Petroleum-Exporting Countries (oil)
- OPRG—oxygenated fuels program reformulated gasoline (oil)
- OREC—ocean resource energy credits
- ORNL—Oak Ridge National Laboratory (U.S.) (nuclear)
- OSHA—U.S. Department of Labor Occupational Safety and Health Administration
- OTAG—Ozone Transport Assessment Group
- OTDF—Outage Transfer Distribution Factor
- OTEC—ocean thermal energy conversion (electricity)

== P ==
- P&ID—Piping & Instrumentation Diagram
- PA—Planning Authority
  - —Programmatic Agreement
- PADD—Petroleum Administration for Defense Districts (US)
- PBR
  - —pebble bed reactor (nuclear)
  - —performance based rates (electricity)
  - —Performance-based regulation
- PCB—polychlorinated biphenyl
- PCM—Project Cycle Management
- PCS—Power conversion system, electric power conversion. Plant Control System.
- PCT—Programmable Communicating Thermostat (electricity), Production Conformity Test
- PD—Preliminary Determination
- PDC—Phasor data concentrator. See description in phasor measurement unit article. (electricity)
- PDCI—Pacific Direct Current Intertie (US) (electricity)
- PDT—Pressure Differential Transmitter
- PE—Programmable Electronic
- PERC—Passivated Emitter Rear Contact (type of PV cell)
- PEM—Proton Exchange Membrane
- PFC—perfluorocarbons
- PFD—Probability of (dangerous) Failure on Demand
- PFDavg—Average Probability of Failure on Demand
- PFH—Probability of (dangerous) Failure per Hour
- PG&E—Pacific Gas & Electric (US) (electricity)
- PGA—Purchased gas adjustment
- PHA—Production Handling Agreement, Process Hazard Analysis
- PHFFU—Plant held for future use
- PIDX—Petroleum Industry Data Exchange (oil)
- PIER—Public Interest Energy Research (CEC)
- PIFUA—Powerplant and Industrial Fuel Use Act of 1978
- PIU—Proven In Use
- PJM—PJM Interconnection, LLC, a regional transmission organization. (US) (electricity)
- PLC—Power line communication (electricity), Programmable Logic Controller
- PLMA—Peak Load Management Association (US) (electricity)
- PM—Particulate matter, Project Manager
- PM&E—Protection, mitigation and enhancement
- PMA—Power Marketing Administration or Fed. Power Marketing Agency (US) (electricity)
- PMU—Phasor measurement unit (electricity)
- PNNL—Pacific Northwest National Laboratory (DOE) (US)
- POD—Point of Delivery
- PoE—Power over Ethernet
- POLES—Prospective On Long Term Energy Systems
- POLR—Provider of last resort (electricity)
- PPA—Power Purchase Agreement (electricity)
- PPI—producer price index
- ppmv—Parts Per Million by Volume
- ppp—Purchasing power parity
- PPR—Potential peak reduction
- PREP—Pacific Regional Energy Programme
- PRESSEA—Promotion of Renewable Energy Sources in South East Asia (PRESSEA)
- Prim—Primary (electricity) nuclear, hydro, geothermal, wind, solar
- PSC—Public Service Commission
- PSD—Prevention of Significant Deterioration, Process ShutDown, Power Supply Drive
- PSE—Puget Sound Energy (US) (electricity)
- PSoC—Partial State of Charge, operational mode of grid supporting batteries able to respond to both demand and excess production, see UltraBattery
- PSV—Pressure Safety Valve
- PTDF—Power Transfer Distribution Factor (electricity)
- PTP—Point to Point Transmission Service (electricity)
- PUC—Public utilities commission (electricity)
- PUD—Public utility district (electricity)
- PUHCA—Public Utility Holding Company Act of 1935 (US) (electricity)
- PURPA—Public Utility Regulatory Policies Act of 1978 (US) (electricity)
- PV—photovoltaic (solar)
- PVC—photovoltaic cell (solar)
- PVC—polyvinyl chloride
- PWR—pressurized water reactor (nuclear)
- PX—Power exchange

== Q ==
- QF—qualifying facility
- QRA—Quantitative Risk Assessment
- QSE—Qualifying scheduling entity
- QUAD—10^{15} Btu (a quadrillion in the short scale)

== R ==
- R/P—Reserve on Production
  - —Reserves to Production
- RA—Risk Assessment
- RAB—Regional Advisory Body (US)
- RAC—Refiners' acquisition cost
- RAP—Regulatory Assistance Project
- RAR—Reasonable assured resources
- RAS—Remedial Action Scheme
- RATC—Recallable Available Transmission Capability
- RBMK—Russian: Реактор Большой Мощности Канальный = "High Power Channel Type Reactor" (RU)
- RBOB—reformulated gasoline blendstock for oxygenate blending
- RC—Reliability Coordinator
- RCIS—Reliability Coordinator Information System
- RCM—Reliability-Centered Maintenance
- RCRA—Resource Conservation and Recovery Act (US)
- RDF—refuse derived fuel (electricity)
- REA—Rural Electrification Administration (US)
- REC—Renewable energy credit (US)
- RECS—Residential Energy Consumption Survey (US)
- REEEP—Renewable Energy and Energy Efficiency Partnership
- RER—Renewable Energy Rider
- RES—Renewable energy source
- RET/EE—IAF Renewable Energy Technology & Energy Efficiency Investment Advisory Facility
- RF—Radio frequency
- RFA—Regulatory Flexibility Act (US)
- RFC—ReliabilityFirst Corporation (US) (electricity)
- RFG—reformulated gasoline (oil)
- RFI—Request for Interchange
- RFP—Request for proposals
- RGGI—Regional Greenhouse Gas Initiative
- RGS—Renewable Generating System
- RICE—Reciprocating Internal Combustion Engine
- RM—Rulemaking
- RMATS—Rocky Mountain Area Transmission Study (US) (electricity)
- RMR—Reliability Must Run (electricity)
- RMU—Removal Units
- ROA—Return of Assets (finance)
- ROE—Return of Equity (finance)
- ROFR—Right of First Refusal (finance)
- ROI—Return on Investment
- ROW—Right of Way
- RPM—Reliability Pricing Model. See explanation in electricity market#Deregulated market experience. (electricity)
- RPN—Risk Priority Number
- RPS—Renewable Portfolio Standards (US)
- RRO—Regional reliability organization (US)
- RSE—Revenue Stream Estimate (finance)
- RSE—relative standard error
- RTBM—Real-Time Balancing Market (electricity)
- RTEP—Regional transmission expansion plan
- RTG—Regional Transmission Group (US)
- RTO—Regional transmission organization (US)
- RTP—Real time Pricing
- RTU—Remote Terminal Unit
- RUS—Rural Utilities Service
- RVP—Reid vapor pressure

== S ==
- SCADA—Supervisory control and data acquisition a remote control and telemetry system used to monitor and control the electrical system
- SCE—Southern California Edison (US)
- SCE&G—South Carolina Electric & Gas (US)
- scf—Standard cubic foot
- SCO—Stranded Cost Obligation (finance)
- SCR—Special Case Resources (US- NYISO category)
- SCR—Selective Catalytic Reduction
- SDG&E—San Diego Gas & Electric (US)
- SEA—Strategic Environmental Assessment
- SEC—Securities and Exchange Commission (US)
- SEER—seasonal energy efficiency ratio
- SEFI—Sustainable Energy Finance Initiative
- SEIA—Sustainable Energy Industry Association
- Seams—Interconnections Seam Study
- SEPA—Smart Energy Power Alliance
- SERC—Southeastern Electric Reliability Council (US)
- SERH—Safety Equipment Reliability Handbook
- SF—Safe Failure
- SF_{6}—sulfur hexafluoride
- SFC—Solid oxide fuel cell (transportation), Static Frequency Converter
- SFEIS—Supplemental Final Environmental Impact Statement (US)
- SFF—Safe Failure Fraction
- SFV—Straight Fixed Variable
- SG—Spark-ignited Gas
- SGR—State game refuge (US)
- SHPO—State Historic Preservation Office (US)
- SI—International System of Units (Système international d'unités)
- SIC—Standard Industrial Classification
- SIF—Safety Instrumented Function
- SIL—Safety Integrity Level
- SIS—Safety Instrumented System
- SLC—Safety Life Cycle
- SMES—Superconducting magnetic energy storage
- SMPs—Special Marketing Programs
- SNG—Synthetic Natural Gas or Substitute Natural Gas
- SO_{2}—Sulfur dioxide
- SoC—State of charge of rechargeable battery
- SOGAV—Solenoid Operated Gas Admission Valve
- SoH—State of health of rechargeable battery
- SOL—System Operating Limit
- SPCC—Spill Prevention, Containment and Countermeasure Plan
  - SPM—Synchronized phasor measurement- a WAMS network with synchrophasor sensors (PMUs). (electricity)
- SPP—Southwest Power Pool Inc., a regional transmission organization (US)
  - —Statewide Pricing Pilot (US-California)
  - —Small power producer (electricity)
- SPR—Strategic Petroleum Reserve (US)
- SPS—Special Protection System
- SR—Speculative resources For example, regarding uranium deposits. (nuclear)
- SRP—Salt River Agricultural Improvement & Power District (US) (electricity)
- SRS—Safety Requirements Specification
- SSG—WI PWG Seams Steering Group of Western Interconnection PlanningWork Group (US) (electricity)
- SSM—Synchronized system measurement-a WAMS with synchronous sensors in addition to PMUs. See Phasor networks.
- SSOV—Safety ShutOff Valve
- STEP—Southwest Transmission Expansion Plan group (US) (electricity)
- SVC—Static VAR compensator (electricity)
- SVEC—Shenandoah Valley Electric Cooperative
- SWAT—Southwest Area Transmission (US) (electricity)
- SWU—Separative work unit

== T ==
- TAME—Tertiary amyl methyl ether
- TAPS—Trans-Alaska Pipeline System (natural gas)
- TBA—tertiary butyl alcohol
- TBL—transmission business line (electricity)
- TBS—town border station
- TF—Test frequency
- Tcf—Trillion cubic feet (measurement)
- TCR—Transition cost recovery (mechanism)
- TDU—Transmission Dependent Utility (electricity)
- TEFRA—Tax Equity and Fiscal Responsibility Act of 1985
- TEN—Trans-European Networks (electricity)
- TLR—Transmission Line Loading Relief Procedures (electricity)
- TMEL—Target mean time between (dangerous) failures
- TO—Transmission owner (electricity)
- toe—Ton of oil equivalent (EU)
- TOP—transmission operator (electricity)
- TOU—time of use (rate) (electricity)
- Transco—transmission company (US) (electricity)
  - —Transcontinental Pipeline (US) (natural gas)
  - —National Transmission Corporation (Philippines)
- TRM—Transmission reliability margin (electricity)
- TS—Two-stage
- TSO—Transmission system operator) (electricity)
- TSR—Transmission service request (electricity)
- TTC—Total transfer capability (electricity)
- TVA—Tennessee Valley Authority (US) (electricity)
- TW—terawatt (one trillion watts) (measurement)
- TWH—terawatt-hour (one trillion watt hours)
- T&D—Transmission and distribution

== U ==
- U.S.C.—United States Code
- U_{3}O_{8}—triuranium octaoxide (nuclear)
- UAE—United Arab Emirates (oil)
- UCAP—Unforced Capacity (electricity)
- UCTE—Union for the Coordination of the Transport of Electricity, the power transmission system of continental Europe
- UD—Useful Diagnostic coverage
- UF_{6}—uranium hexafluoride (nuclear)
- UFLS—Under frequency load shedding (electricity)
- UHVAC—ultra-high-voltage alternating current (electricity)
- UHVDC—ultra-high-voltage direct current (electricity)
- ULCC—Ultra Large Crude Carrier (oil)
- UMTRA—Uranium Mill Tailings Radiation Control Act of 1978 (US)
- UNCCD—United Nations Convention to Combat Desertification
- UNDESA—UN Department of Economic and Social Affairs
- UNDP—United Nations Development Programme
- UNDP—United Nations Development Programme
- UNECE—United Nations Economic Commission for Europe
- UNEP—United Nations Environment Programme
- UNFCCC—United Nations Framework Convention on Climate Change
- UNIC—Universal Control(s)
- UO_{2}—uranium dioxide (nuclear)
- UO_{3}—uranium trioxide (nuclear)
- UO_{4}—uranyl peroxide (nuclear)
- UOX—uranium oxide (nuclear)
- URR—Ultimate Recoverable Resources
- USBR—United States Bureau of Reclamation
- USCE—United States Army Corps of Engineers
- US DOE—United States Department of Energy
- USGS—United States Geological Survey
- UVLS—under voltage load shedding (electricity)

== V ==
- V—Volt (measurement)
- VA—Volt-ampere (measurement)
- var—Volt-ampere reactive (measurement)
- VAWT—vertical axis wind turbine (wind)
- VIN—vehicle identification number (US) (transportation)
- VLCC—very large crude carrier (oil)
- VMT—vehicle miles traveled (transportation)
- VOC—volatile organic compound
- VPP—Variable peak pricing (electricity)
- VSA—Voltage stability analysis

== W ==
- W—Watt
- WACOG—weighted average cost of gas
- WAMS—Wide area measurement system, also Wide area monitoring system - see description in phasor measurement unit article. (electricity)
- WCMC—World Conservation Monitoring Centre
- WCRE—World Commission on Renewable Energy
- WEA—World Energy Assessment
- WEC—World Energy Council
- WECC—Western Electricity Coordinating Council (US)
- WEI—Western Electric Institute (US)
- WEEA—World Energy Efficiency Organization
- WH—watthour (measurement)
- WHO—World Health Organization
- WI—Work Item
- WIRAB—Western Interconnection Regional Advisory Body (US)
- WRI—World Resources Institute
- WSCC—Western Systems Coordinating Council (US)
- WSPP—Western Systems Power Pool (US)
- WSSD—World Summit on Sustainable Development
- WTG—Wind turbine generator (wind)
- WTI—West Texas Intermediate (US)
- WTP—Willingness to pay
- WY—Water Year (measurement)

== Appendix: Residential energy acronyms ==
The following table lists a number of terms that are used in the United States for residential energy audits.

- AFUE—annual fuel utilization efficiency
- BTL—building tightness limit (building tightness)
- CDH—cooling degree hours (climate)
- CFL—compact fluorescent light
- COP—coefficient of performance
- CRI—color rendering index
- EEM—Energy Efficient Mortgage
- EER—energy efficiency ratio
- EF—energy factor (clothes washers)
- EIM—Energy Improvement Mortgage
- ERV—energy-recovery ventilator
- HDD—heating degree day
- HHI—home heating index
- HID—high-intensity discharge
- HRV—heat-recovery ventilator
- HSPF—heating seasonal performance factor
- HVI—Home Ventilating Institute
- IECC—International Energy Conservation Code
- K-value—thermal conductance
- Low-e—low emissivity
- LEED—Leadership in Energy and Environmental Design, standard for Green Building design
- MEF—modified energy factor (clothes washers)
- MINHERS—Mortgage Industry National Home Energy Rating Systems Standards
- MVG—minimum ventilation guideline (building tightness)
- MVL—minimum ventilation level (building tightness)
- NAECA—National Appliance Energy Conservation Act
- ODS—oxygen depletion sensor
- RESNET—Residential energy services network
- R-value—thermal resistance
- SC—shading coefficient (windows)
- SEER—seasonal E efficiency ratio
- SHGC—solar heat gain coefficient
- SIR—savings-to-investment ratio (energy conservation investments)
- SLA—Specific leakage area
- SPB—Simple Payback (energy conservation investments)
- SSE—steady-state efficiency
- U-value—thermal transmittance (also called U-factor)
- WF—water factor (clothes washers)

== See also ==
- Acronym
- Lists of abbreviations

== Notes ==
- "Technology Acronyms and Abbreviations". All Acronyms.
- "Energy Information Agency list of acronyms". Energy Information Administration.
- "Federal energy regulatory commission- Help- acronyms". Federal Energy Regulatory Commission.
- "World energy, technology and climate policy outlook- list of acronyms" (PDF). European Commission.
- "Distributed Power Generation in Europe: technical issues for further integration- list of acronyms". European Commission. Archived from the original (pdf) on 2011-07-20.
