= Western Resource Adequacy Program =

Utility agreement

The Western Resource Adequacy Program (WRAP) is an electricity planning and sharing agreement between electric utilities of the Western Power Pool. Its goals are to improve regional reliability and adequacy while decreasing costs by moving utilities from an individual utility framework to a regional approach. Program operations are based in Oregon.

The agreement calls for "forward showing" in which utilities must forecast demand seven months in advance and prove that they have secured access to sufficient supply to meet that forecast along with sufficient transmission capacity to deliver that supply. It also calls for an "operational program" where utilities with an unforeseen near-term deficit can call out to other utilities for spare capacity via a regional marketplace. Lastly, it calls for "enforcement" in which utilities can be charged for noncompliance.

The initial phase of the program is voluntary. As of April 2023, 22 utilities from Canada and the USA have committed to this phase of the program. The secondary phase of the program is binding. Enforcement will begin in Summer 2025, with a probationary period running until Summer 2028. The tariff for the WRAP was approved by the Federal Energy Regulatory Commission in 2023.

Two additional sharing markets, California Independent System Operator's Extended Day Ahead Market (EDAM) and Southwest Power Pool's (SPP) Markets+, will operate in adjacent areas and interoperate as needed.

== See also ==
- RTOs and ISOs
- Western Electricity Coordinating Council (WECC)
