= Lists of abbreviations =

Listicles of various abbreviations

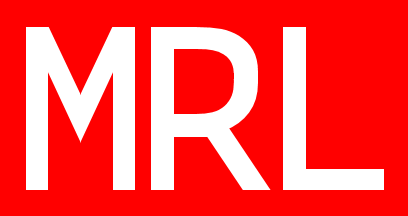

Lists of abbreviations contain abbreviations and acronyms in different languages and fields. They include Latin and English abbreviations and acronyms.

== Classical abbreviations ==
- List of classical abbreviations (Latin abbreviations that occur in the writings and inscriptions of the Romans)
- List of Latin abbreviations (Common Latin abbreviations that have been adopted by Modern English)
- List of medieval abbreviations (Abbreviations used by ancient and medieval scribes writing in various languages, including Latin, Greek, Old English and Old Norse)

== English language abbreviations ==
Lists of abbreviations in the English language:

- Athletics abbreviations
- List of business and finance abbreviations
- List of computing and IT abbreviations
- List of ecclesiastical abbreviations
- List of energy abbreviations
- List of abbreviations in photography
- List of glossing abbreviations (grammatical terms used in linguistic interlinear glossing)
- List of legal abbreviations
- List of medical abbreviations
- List of abbreviations for medical organisations and personnel
- Reporting mark (owners of rolling stock and other railway equipment)
- List of style guide abbreviations
- List of abbreviations used on Wikipedia for Wikipedia things

== Acronyms ==
An acronym is a type of abbreviation formed from the initial components of the words of a longer name or phrase,

- Lists of acronyms
- Three-letter acronyms
- List of government and military acronyms
- List of U.S. government and military acronyms
- List of U.S. Navy acronyms

== Other languages ==
Abbreviations in other languages:

- List of German abbreviations
- List of Hebrew abbreviations

== See also ==
- Category:Lists of abbreviations
- Category:Glossaries of sports
