= Fulsome Creek =

Coordinates: 33°20′22.5″N 82°51′32.2″W

Location
- Country: United States
- State: Georgia

Fulsome Creek is a stream located in the U.S. state of Georgia. It serves as a tributary to the Ogeechee River.

== History ==
The creek is named after Captain Benjamin Fulsam, an early settler who was killed by Indians. Over time, the name of the creek has been spelled in various ways, including "Folsoms Creek", "Fulsams Creek", and "Fulsoms Creek".
