= Oak Cane Branch =

Water course in Georgia, USA

Coordinates: 32°46′6.59″N 81°55′34.41″W

Oak Cane Branch is a stream in the U.S. state of Georgia. It is a tributary to the Ogeechee River.

Variant names were "O'Cain Creek", "O'Kane Branch", "Oak Cane Creek", "Ocain's Branch", and "Ocains Branch". The present name is a corruption of the last name of Daniel O'Cain, an 18th-century landholder.
