= Midcontinent Independent System Operator =

Transmission system operator in the United States and Canada

- Abbreviation: MISO
- Formation: March 1998; 28 years ago
- Type: Nonprofit organization
- Legal status: 501(c)(4)
- Headquarters: Carmel, Indiana, U.S.
- Coordinates: 39.966715°N 86.143745°W
- Services: Independent System Operator; Regional Transmission Organization
- Chief Executive Officer: John R. Bear
- Chair, Board of Directors: Todd Raba
- Revenue: $400,001,689 (2018)
- Expenses: $400,001,689 (2018)
- Employees: 1,096 (2018)
- Website: www.misoenergy.org

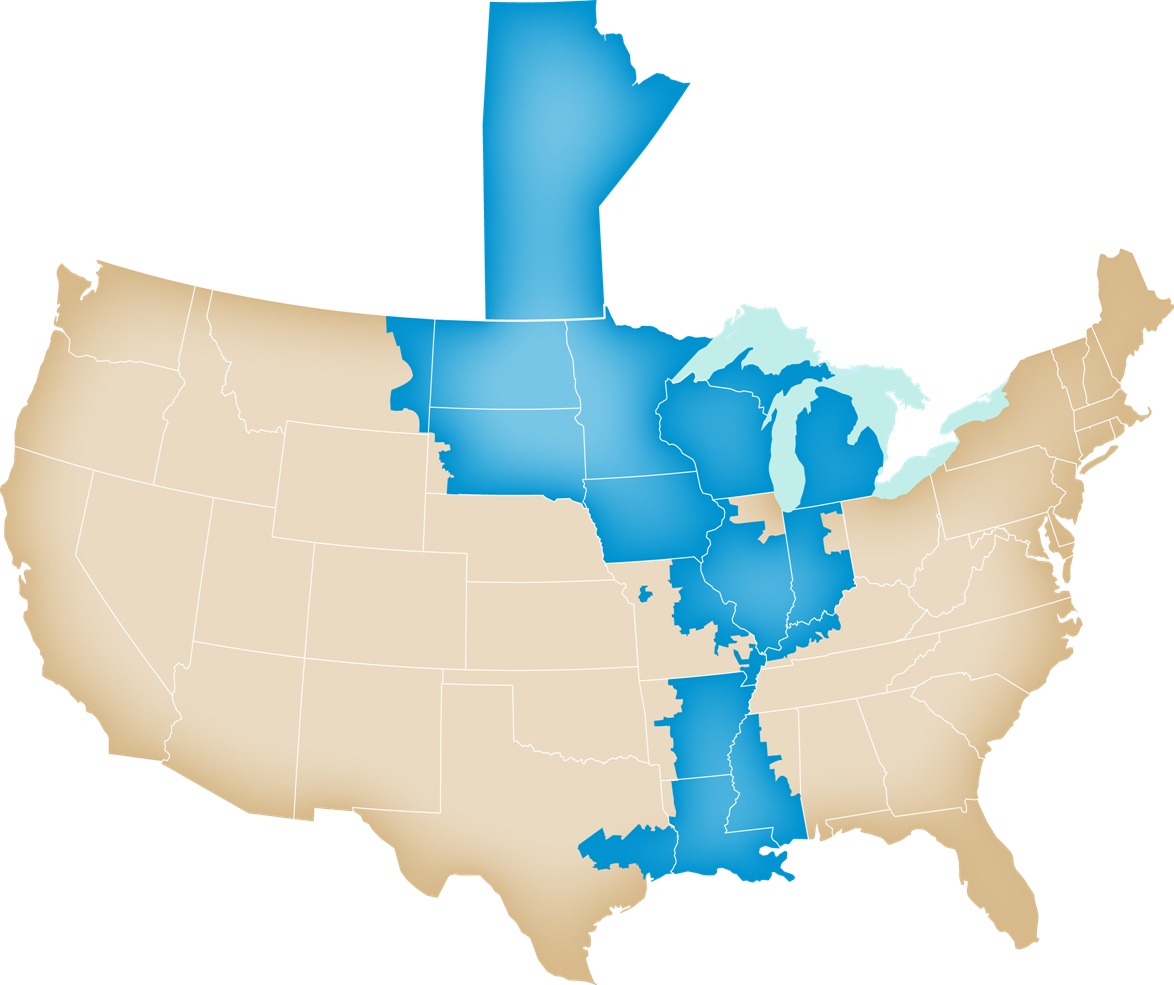
MISO Reliability Footprint

The Midcontinent Independent System Operator (MISO), formerly named Midwest Independent Transmission System Operator, is an Independent System Operator (ISO) and Regional Transmission Organization (RTO) established in 1998. It provides open-access transmission service and monitors the high-voltage transmission system in the Midwestern United States, in Manitoba, Canada, and in a southern U.S. region that includes much of Arkansas, Mississippi, and Louisiana. MISO also operates one of the world's largest real-time energy markets. The 15 states covered by MISO are: Arkansas, Illinois, Indiana, Iowa, Kentucky, Louisiana, Michigan, Minnesota, Mississippi, Missouri, Montana, North Dakota, South Dakota, Texas, and Wisconsin.

== Definition of ISOs and RTOs ==
Both Independent System Operator (ISO)s and Regional Transmission Organization (RTO) are organizations formed with the approval of the Federal Energy Regulatory Commission (FERC) to coordinate, control and monitor the use of the electric transmission system by utilities, generators and marketers. An ISO is a non-profit organization which combines the transmission facilities of several transmission owners into a single transmission system to move energy over long distances at a single lower price than the combined charges of each utility that may be located between the buyer and seller. The ISO provides non-discriminatory service and must be independent of the transmission owners and the customers who use its system.

RTOs also provide non-discriminatory access to the transmission network. However, they are required to meet specific FERC regulations that deal with transmission planning and expansion for an entire region, the use of energy markets to deal with system congestion, of power users and owners. RTOs offer regional wholesale electric transmission services under one tariff.

FERC first required transmission owners to provide non-discriminatory access to their lines in Order Nos. 888 and 889, building on the model it had used to require interstate natural gas pipelines to provide access to pipeline capacity. In those orders, FERC noted that ISOs could provide the additional assurance of independence from the owners and eliminate multiple ("pancaked") rates to transmit electricity over long distances. Shortly after that, FERC Order No. 2000 encouraged the formation of RTOs to regionally manage portions of North America's electricity grid.

There are nine ISOs, five of which are RTOs, operating in North America. They manage the systems that serve two-thirds of the customers in the U.S. and over half the population of Canada. Over time, the distinction between ISOs and RTOs in the United States has become insignificant. Both organizations provide similar transmission services under a single tariff at a single rate, and they operate energy markets within their footprints.

== History ==
The Midcontinent Independent System Operator (MISO) was established in 1998 as Midwest Independent Transmission System Operator, Inc., an independent and member-based non-profit organization, and was approved as the nation's first RTO by FERC in 2001. The organization is headquartered in Carmel, Indiana with operation control centers in Carmel, Eagan, Minnesota, and Little Rock, Arkansas.

MISOs members include 54 transmission owners with more than 75,000 miles of transmission lines. Members include investor-owned utilities, public power utilities, and cooperatives, such as: Entergy, AES Indiana, International Transmission Company, Great River Energy, Xcel Energy, and City Water Light and Power.

MISO began its operation on "Day 1", a development phase between 1998 and 2005. Throughout this period, the company initiated and built up transmission services to increase grid reliability. MISO was established as an ISO in 1998 after voluntary discussions led to its formation. One year later, the first board of directors was elected. By the end of 2000, the organization had more than 70 employees. In 2001, FERC approved MISO as the nation's first RTO.

In 2005, MISO announced the opening of the MISO Energy Markets. The new services ushered in MISO's "Day 2" development phase, providing a wholesale electricity market that settles $2 billion in transactions each month. During this period, MISO grew its employee base to more than 600 staff, and moved the corporate headquarters and operations center under one roof in Carmel, Indiana.

In addition to Day-Ahead and Real-Time markets, MISO operates an ancillary services market that began on January 6, 2009. This market provides energy and operating reserves and regulation and response services supporting reliable transmission services.

The name was changed from Midwest Independent Transmission System Operator, Inc. to Midcontinent Independent System Operator in April 2013.

In December 2024, the MISO board of directors approved a transmission plan calling for a 765-kV transmission “backbone” in the area served, assisting in managing power load increases, changing generation resources and reacting to adverse weather. The estimated investment for the project is $30 billion (US) and, with regulatory review and approval, will be operational from 2032 to 2034. Long range net benefits are projected at $23 billion to $72 billion over 20 years.

== Workforce ==
MISO is governed by an independent ten-member Board of Directors, consisting of nine independent directors elected by the membership, and the president of MISO. No board member may have been a director, officer, or employee of a member, user, or affiliate of a member or user for two years before or after the election to the Board. Under MISO's Standards of Conduct, all MISO board members, employees, and their immediate family members must divest themselves of any financial holdings in member or user companies.

As of 2018, MISO employed a staff of 1,096 employees between its regional offices and control centers.

== Technology ==
MISO uses a computer model called a State Estimator that analyzes real-time conditions of the MISO power grid. The system has been in operation since December 31, 2003. It serves as the primary management tool for the reliability of transmission facilities throughout the organization's footprint. The State Estimator is one of the world's largest computer systems and provides 303,800 data points that are updated every 5 seconds.

== Operations ==
As the primary ISO in the Midwest and South United States, MISO carries out operational responsibilities to maintain energy flow.

=== Grid management and reliability ===
Data is evaluated by reliability coordinators and reliability analysts, monitoring the grid 24/7. Projecting power movement in real-time, MISO's control room staff monitors and manages activity on the electric transmission system.

MISO performs regional planning in accordance with FERC principles. As of 2015 MISO infrastructure planning had four primary objectives:

- provide an efficient and reliable transmission system
- access a diverse number of energy resources, including renewable energies
- expand energy trading opportunities
- meet state and federal energy policy objectives

The open market began on April 1, 2005, and has provided financially binding day-ahead and real-time energy pricing. MISO Markets include a Financial Transmission Rights Market, a Day-Ahead Market, a Real-Time Market, and a market for operating reserves and regulation. They are operated and settled separately, providing a clear look at day-to-day price changes.

== Planning efforts ==
Since its inception in 2003, MISO Transmission Expansion Plan (MTEP) has been a long-term annual planning study which identifies and supports the development of transmission infrastructure that is sufficiently robust to meet local and regional reliability standards and enables competition among wholesale energy suppliers. The MISO Board of Directors has been reviewing the MTEP annually during its December meeting. MTEP includes recommendations for transmission infrastructure additions and electric grid improvements. MTEP plans have recommended almost $6.9 billion in transmission projects, totaling $2.2 billion already in operation.

In cooperation with PJM Interconnection (PJM), the two organizations developed a Joint and Common Market (JCM) to align market rules between them and to reduce the operating impact of the many transmission interconnections between the two RTOs. In December 2003, the two RTOs filed a Joint Operating Agreement with FERC, detailing how the organizations will share information and phase in their respective operations.
