= Ogeechee River =

River in state of Georgia, U.S.

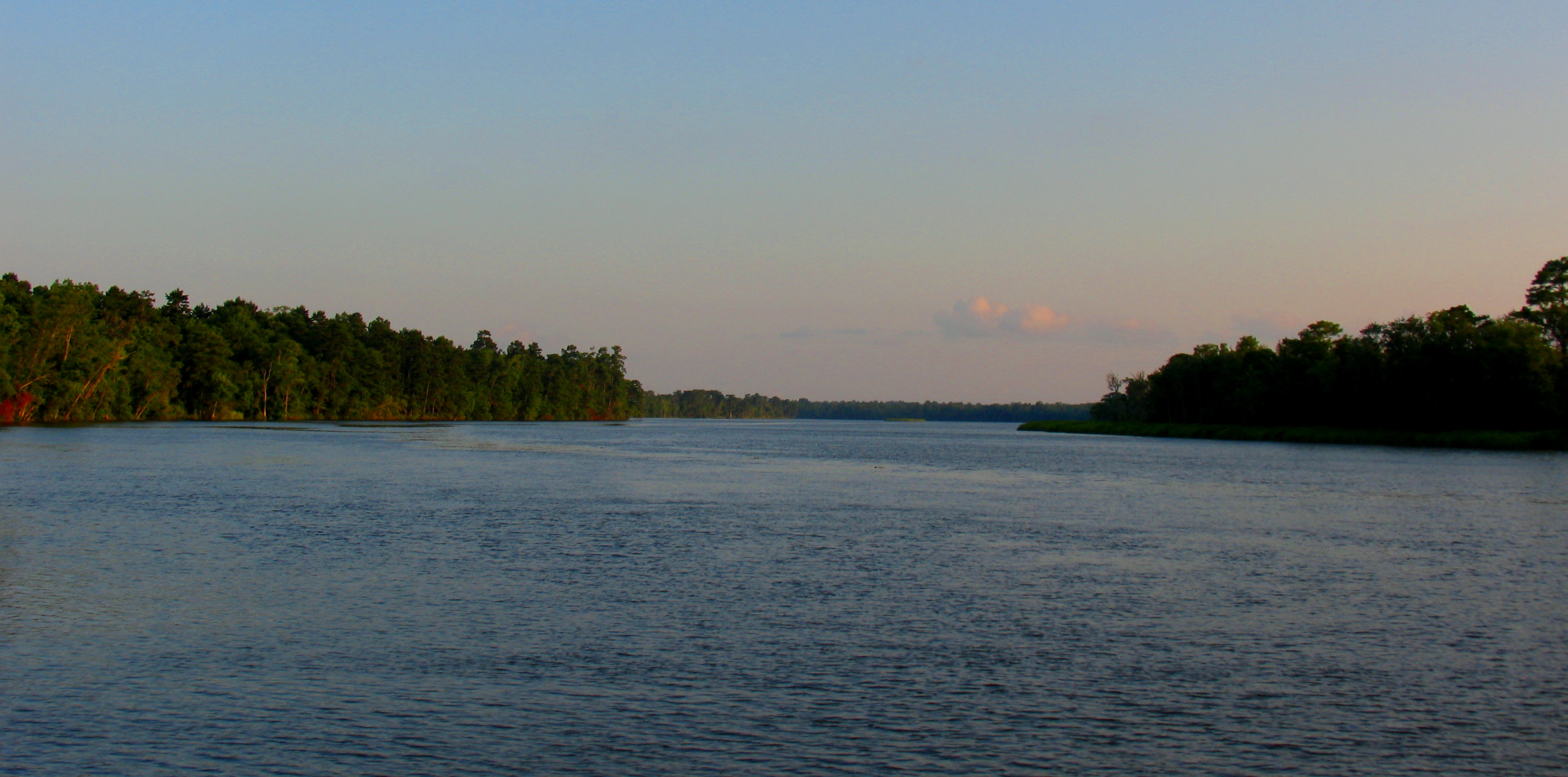
- The Ogeechee River near Savannah, Georgia

- Location of mouth

Location
- Country: United States
- State: Georgia

Physical characteristics
- Source
  - location: United States
- Mouth
  - coordinates: 31°50′1″N 81°1′39″W

Basin features
- Tributaries
  - left: Canoochee River

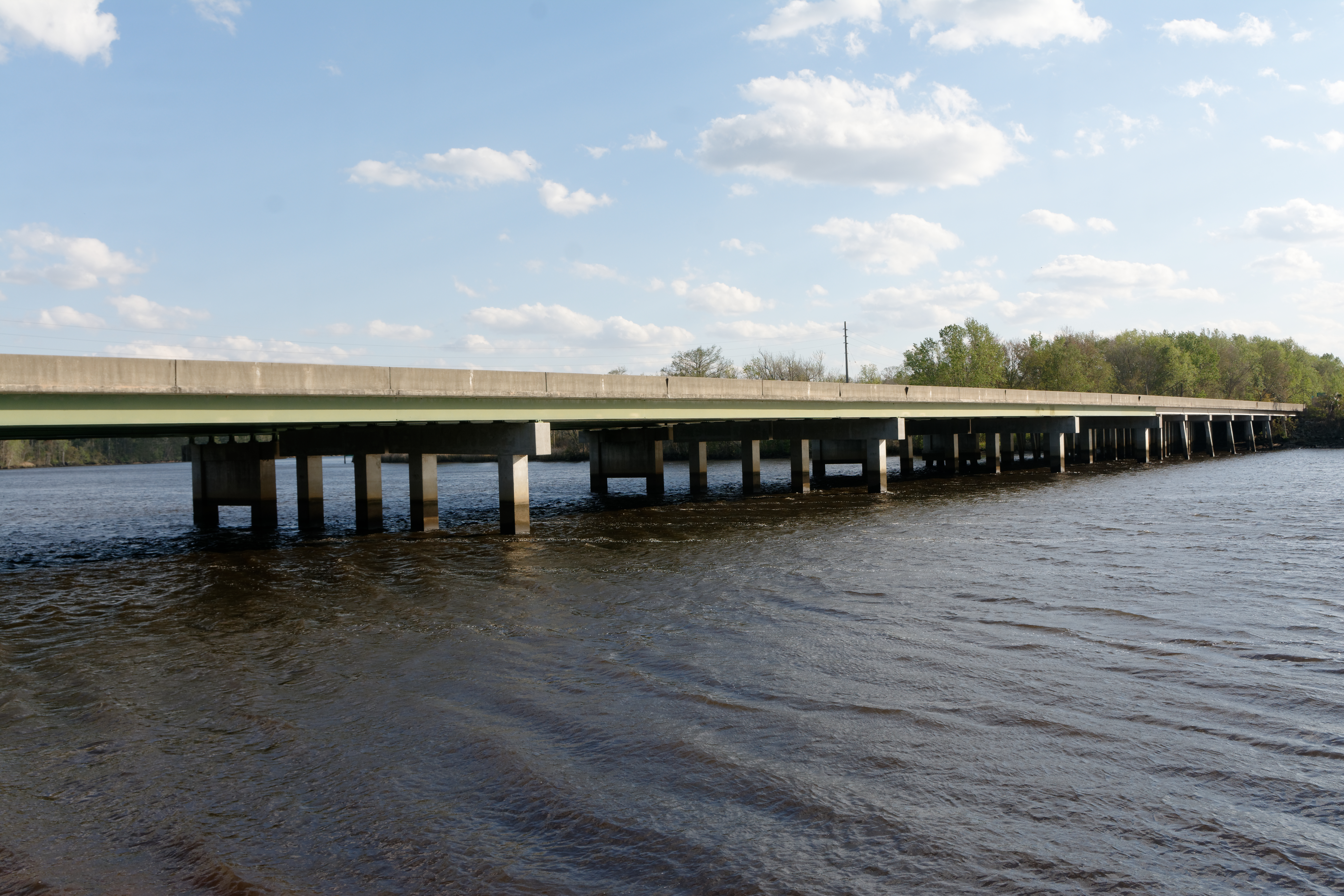
US 17 crossing the river in Chatham County, Georgia

The Ogeechee River is a 294-mile-long (473 km) blackwater river in the U.S. state of Georgia. It heads at the confluence of its North and South Forks, about 2.5 miles (4.0 km) south-southwest of Crawfordville and flowing generally southeast to Ossabaw Sound about 16 miles (26 km) south of Savannah. Its largest tributary is the Canoochee River, which drains approximately 1,400 square miles (3,600 km^{2}) and is the only other major river in the basin. The Ogeechee has a watershed of 5,540 square miles (14,300 km^{2}). It is one of the state's few free-flowing streams.

== Course ==
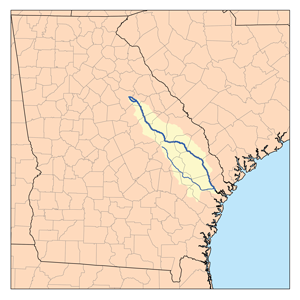
Ogeechee River watershed

The Ogeechee runs from the Piedmont across the Fall Line and Sandhills regions. There it flows across the coastal plain of Georgia to the Atlantic Ocean. From a shallow clear running stream with several shoals, rapids, and a small falls at Shoals, below Louisville the river becomes a lazy meandering channel through cypress swamps and miles of undeveloped forests.

== Geology ==
=== Rocks ===
The Ogeechee River basin contains parts of the Piedmont and Coastal Plain physiographic provinces, which extend throughout the southeastern United States. This boundary follows the contact between older crystalline metamorphic rocks of the Piedmont Province and the younger unconsolidated Cretaceous and Tertiary sediments of the Coastal Plain Province. Other rock types found in the basin include metasedimentary rock, schists and phyllites, felsic and mafic metavolcanic rocks, and amphibolite. Coastal Plain sediments overlap the igneous and metamorphic rocks of the southern edge of the Piedmont Province at the Fall Line.

=== Soils ===
The Ogeechee River watershed in Georgia crosses four major land resource areas. About 6 percent of the area lies within the Southern Piedmont MLRA, about 4 percent in the Carolina and Georgia Sand Hills MLRA, 48 percent in the Southern Coastal Plain MLRA, and 42 percent in the Atlantic Coast Flatwoods MLRA. The dominant soils in this part of the watershed have 40 to 60 inches of sandy materials overlying a loamy subsoil. Soils in the Southern Coastal Plain part of the watershed are more variable than in other parts, especially concerning their textures and water table depths.

== History ==
Paleo-Indian societies arrived in the area of the Ogeechee River around 11,500 years ago, and the river was settled for several centuries by the Mississippians and Yuchi until the arrival of Europeans. In fact, though the origin of the name "Ogeechee" is uncertain, it may be derived from a Muskogee term meaning "river of the Uchees", referring to the Yuchi people, who inhabited areas near it. Some scholars have drawn a connection between the river's name and the name Gullah Geechee for the Gullah people who inhabit coastal Georgia.

== Tributaries ==
- Oak Cane Branch

== See also ==
- South Atlantic-Gulf Water Resource Region
