= List of German abbreviations =

This list of German abbreviations includes abbreviations, acronyms and initialisms found in the German language. Because German words can be famously long, use of abbreviation is particularly common. Even the language's shortest words are often abbreviated, such as the conjunction und (and) written just as "u." This article covers standard abbreviations in colloquial and official use. It does not include abbreviations that are important historically but no longer in common usage, such as k. u. k. for Imperial and Royal and OKW for Oberkommando der Wehrmacht.

== Types ==
As in English or Latin, German written abbreviations consist of a letter, letters or partial words shortened from a longer word or phrase, such as etc. for et cetera. Acronyms are a type of abbreviation pronounced as a single word, such as Laser. Initialisms are abbreviations in which each initial in the abbreviation is pronounced separately, such as FBI. It is unsettled question in English style guides whether the word acronym can be used to also describe initialisms. This list makes a distinction between the types because of the way German-speakers create, use and pronounce them.

- Abbreviations: German written abbreviations are often punctuated and are pronounced as the full word when read aloud, such as beispielsweise for bspw. ("for example"). Unlike English, which is moving away from periods in abbreviations in some style guides, the placement of capital letters and periods is important in German.
- Acronyms are abbreviations consisting of initials of words in the original phrase, written without periods, and pronounced as if they were a single word. Examples that have made their way into German from English include Laser or NATO. In German, acronyms retain the grammatical gender of their primary noun.
- Syllable words (German: Silbenkurzwörter), or syllabic abbreviation or clipping, is a particularly German method of creating an abbreviation by combining the first two or more letters of each word to form a single word. An example is the gummy bear brand Haribo, which is derived from the name of its creator Hans Riegel and the city where it was created, Bonn. A number of German syllable words have made it into English usage, such as Adidas, from company founder Adi Dassler, and Gestapo for Geheime StaatsPolizei (Secret State Police). Although used and pronounced as words in their own right, according to Helmut Glück they are classified as acronyms.
- Initialism is a type of abbreviation consisting of the initials of each word in a phrase, almost always capitalized, and pronounced separately. In German they are never punctuated. Examples include EU for European Union and DDR for German Democratic Republic. Initialisms are typically found in commercial, government, legal, medical, scientific and technical uses. In German, initialisms retain the grammatical gender of their primary noun.

== Key to sources in tables ==
These sources apply to all three tables. In special cases an entry will be additionally referenced.

Key	Source	Dates	Type	Citation
L	Langenscheidt's Compact German Dictionary	1993, 2003	Reference work	
Da	Dartmouth College Department of German	2019	academic website	
DW	Deutsche Welle	2015, 2020	Public broadcaster	
T	ThoughtCo, via Dotdash	2020	Listicle	
F	FluentU, based on abkuerzungen.de	2018	Blog	

== List of German abbreviations ==
This is a selection of standard written abbreviations and symbols in German. The primary reference is Langenscheidt with additional sources providing more current uses and an indication of their popularity. German abbreviations are pronounced just like the full word or phrase when read aloud. Measurements are normally reduced to initials, written in lowercase, and without punctuation. Measurements of capacity in cooking can be uppercase.

Abbreviation	German	English Equivalent	Notes	Sources
⌀	Durchschnitt	average		
€	Euro	Euro		T
*	geboren (geb.)	born		T
†	gestorben (gest.)	died		T
Abzw.	Abzweigung	diversion		F
am.	amerikanisch	American	adjective	L, T
amtl.	amtlich	official		L, T
Anh.	Anhang	appendix		L, T
Ank.	Ankunft	arrival		L, T
Anl.	Anlage	enclosure		L, T
Anm.	Anmerkung	note		L, T
anschl.	anschließend	following		L
a.o.	außerordentlicher Professor	Associate professor		L
App.	Apartment/Wohnung	apartment	accommodations/real estate	L, T, F
App.	Apparat	extension	telephone	L
a.Rh.	am Rhein	on the Rhine	in place names	L, T
Art.	Artikel	article		L
Aufl.	Auflage	edition	books	L, T
Ausg.	Ausgabe	copy	books	L
AW	Antwort	Re:, in reply	email	T
B	Bundesstraße	Federal highway	German and Austrian national highways	L
b.	bei	at, with, near, c/o		L, T
Bd., Bde.	Band, Bände	volume(s)	books	L, T
beil.	beiliegend	enclosed	letters	L, T
bes.	besonders	especially		L, T
best.	bestimmt	definite	typically seen in dictionaries, as in definite article	
bspw.	beispielsweise	for example		Da, F
Best.-Nr.	Bestellnummer	order number		L, T
Betr.	Betreff	Re:, regarding		L, T
Bev.	Bevölkerung	pop., population		L
Bez.	Bezeichnung	term, designation		L, T
Bez.	Bezirk	district	local government	L, T
Bio.	Billion	trillion (10^{12})	The German language uses the long scale. Modern English "billion" (10^{9}) is Milliard.	
Bhf.	Bahnhof	railroad station		L, T
brit.	britisch	British		L
b.w.	bitte wenden	please turn over	common way to close an email message to friends	L, T, F
bzgl.	bezüglich	with reference to	relating to, regarding	L, T
bzw.	beziehungsweise	respectively	meaning varies in context, can also be: and/or, but, rather, alternatively, more specifically	L, Da, DW, T, F
ca.	circa, ungefähr, etwa	circa, about, approximately		L, T
Chr.	Christus	Christ		T
cm	Zentimeter	centimetre		L, Da
d.Ä.	der Ältere	senior, the elder, Sr.	also see d.J. below	L, T
dazw.	dazwischen	between them		F
ders.	derselbe	the same		
desgl.	desgleichen	likewise, ditto		F
dF, dtF	deutsche Fassung	German [dubbed] version	films etc.	T
dgl.	dergleichen/desgleichen	the like		L, T, Da
d.h.	das heißt	i.e., that is		L, T
d.i.	das ist	i.e., that is		L
Di	Dienstag	Tuesday	date/time	L, T
Dipl.	Diplom	Diplom	diploma (an academic degree in the German-speaking countries)	L
Dipl.-Ing.	Diplom-Ingenieur	engineering diploma, cf. MEng, MSc, M.S.		L, T
Dipl.-Kfm.	Diplom-Kaufmann	business degree, cf. Master of Business Administration		T
Dir.	Direktion	administrative office		T
Dir.	Direktor	administrator, manager, principal		L, T
Dir.	Dirigent	conductor	of music	T
d.J.	der Jüngere	junior, the younger, Jr.	also see d.Ä. above	L, T
d.M.	dieses Monats	of this month		L, F
d.O.	die (das) Obige	the above-mentioned		L
d.o.	dito	ditto		L, F
Do	Donnerstag	Thursday	date/time	L, T
Dr.	Doktor	Doctor		L
Dr. med.	Doktor der Medizin	M.D., medical doctorate		L, T
Dr. phil.	Doktor der Philosophie	Ph.D., Doctor of Philosophy		L, T
Dr. sc. nat.	Doktor der Naturwissenschaften	Sc. D., Doctor of Science		L
dt.	deutsch	German	as an adjective	L, T
Dtzd.	Dutzend	dozen		L, T
e.h.	ehrenhalber	hon., honorary	degree, etc.	L, T
ehem.	ehemals/ehemalig	formerly/former		L, T
eigtl.	eigentlich	actually, really		L, T
einschl.	einschließlich	including, inclusive		L, T
engl.	englisch	English	as an adjective	L
EL	Esslöffel	tbsp., tablespoon	in recipes	T, Da
E-Literatur	erhobene Literatur	serious literature		T
E-Musik	erhobene Musik	classical music		T
entspr.	entsprechend	corresponding, accordingly		L, T
erb.	erbaut	built, erected		L, T
Erw.	Erwachsene	adult(s)	noun	L, T
erw.	erweitert	expanded, extended		T
ev.	evangelisch	Evangelical (a Protestant church)	adjective	L, T
e.V.	eingetragener Verein	registered organization (not-for-profit organization)		Da, L, T
evtl.	eventuell	perhaps, possible/possibly, potential(ly)	adjective or adverb; note this does not mean "eventually"	Da, L, T
e.Wz.	eingetragenes Warenzeichen	registered trademark		T
exkl.	exklusive	excluding, exclusive of		L, T
f.	für	for		DW
f./ff.	folgende Seite(n)	and following page(s)		L, F
Fa.	Firma	company, firm		L, T
Fam.	Familie	family		L, T
FdH	Friss die Hälfte	eat half	Popular German dieting practice which recommends eating only half of what one would usually eat during a typical day. Fressen is a verb normally reserved for animals; used of people, it implies gorging oneself.	DW
F.f., Forts. f.	Fortsetzung folgt	to be continued		L, T
Ffm.	Frankfurt am Main			T
FKK	Freikörperkultur	Free Body Culture	nudist movement with a long history in Germany	L, DW
Fr	Freitag	Friday	date/time	L, T, DW
Fr.	Frau	Mrs./Ms.	In modern usage any woman age 18 or above is addressed as Frau, whether married or not.	L, T, DW
fr.	frei	free		DW
Frl.	Fräulein	Miss	In modern usage any woman age 18 or above is addressed as Frau, whether married or not.	L, T
Frfr.	Freifrau	wife of a Freiherr, former title of nobility, equivalent to Baroness (since 1919 part of the surname in Germany, banned in Austria)		DW
frz.	französisch	French	as an adjective	L, T
g	Gramm	gram, grams		L, T
geb.	geboren, geborene	born, né(e)		L, T, Da, F
Gebr.	Gebrüder	Bros., brothers		L, T
gedr.	gedruckt	printed		T
gegr.	gegründet	established, founded		L, T
gek.	gekürzt	abridged	of books	L, T
Ges.	Gesellschaft	association, company, society		L, T
gesch.	geschieden	divorced		L, T, DW
geschl.	geschlossen	closed		DW
geschr.	geschrieben	written		DW
ges.gesch.	gesetzlich geschützt	patented (lit. 'legally protected')		L, DW
gest.	gestorben	died, deceased		L, T
gez.	gezeichnet	signed		L, T
ggf./ggfs.	gegebenenfalls	if applicable, if required		L, T, Da
GmbH	Gesellschaft mit beschränkter Haftung	limited liability company	GesmbH in Austria	L, T
gGmbH	gemeinnützige GmbH	nonprofit organization (lit. 'publicly beneficial limited company')		L
gnt.	Genannt	called or known by (as in a name)		
ha	Hektar	hectare		L, T
Hbf.	Hauptbahnhof	central railway station		L, T
hpts.	hauptsächlich	mainly		T
Hptst.	Hauptstadt	capital city		T
Hr./Hrn.	Herr/Herrn	Mr	form of address	L, T
Hrsg.	Herausgeber	editor, edited by		L, T
i.A.	im Auftrag	per, as per	often at the bottom of an official letter when somebody signs on behalf of somebody else	L, T
i.b.	im besonderen	in particular		L, T
i.B.	im Breisgau	in Breisgau	used in place names, e.g. Freiburg i.B.	T
IC	Intercityzug	InterCity train		T
ICE	Intercity-Expresszug	Intercity Express		T
i.D.	im Durchschnitt	on average		L, F
i.H.	im Hause	in-house, on the premises		T
i.J.	im Jahre	in the year		L, T
Ing.	Ingenieur	engineer	title	L, T
Inh.	Inhaber	owner, proprietor		L, T
Inh.	Inhalt	contents	books	L, T
inkl.	inklusive	including, inclusive of		L, T
i.R.	im Ruhestand	ret., retired		L, T
i.V.	in Vertretung	by proxy, on behalf of		T
i.V.	in Vorbereitung	in preparation		T
i.V.	im Vorjahr	in the previous year		L, T
inzw.	inzwischen	in the meantime		F
jew.	jeweils	each, each of, each time		
Jh.	Jahrhundert	century		L, T, F
JH	Jugendherberge	youth hostel		T
jhrl.	jährlich	annual(ly), yearly	date/time	L, T
JWD	janz weit draußen	way out there	Berliner dialect for "in the middle of nowhere"	DW
k.A.	keine Angabe	not rated	films etc.	T
Kap.	Kapitel	chapter		L, T
kath.	katholisch	Catholic	adjective	L, T
Kfm.	Kaufmann	merchant, businessman, dealer, agent		L, T
kfm.	kaufmännisch	commercial		L, T
Kfz	Kraftfahrzeug	motor vehicle		L, T
kg	Kilogramm	kilogram		L, F
kgl.	königlich	royal		L, T
Kl.	Klasse	class	e.g. 1. Kl. "first class"	L, T
km	Kilometer	kilometer		L, F
kompl.	komplette	complete		F
kW	Kilowatt	kilowatt		L, F
l	Liter	liter		L, T, Da
l.	links	left		L, F
led.	ledig	unmarried		L, F
LG	Liebe Grüsse	loving regards	common way to close an email message to friends	DW
LKW/Lkw	Lastkraftwagen	truck, lorry	also used for sport utility vehicle	L, T
L.m.a.A	Leck mich am Arsch	lick my ass	Known as the Swabian salute, via Goethe and Mozart	DW
m	Meter	meter	length	L, F
mm	Millimeter	millimeter		L, F
MA	Mittlealter	Middle Ages		L, T
m.a.W.	mit anderen Worten	in other words		L, F
max.	maximal	maximum		L
m.E.	meines Erachtens	in my opinion		L, T, Da, F
MfG	Mit freundlichen Grüßen	with friendly regards (lit. 'greetings')	for formal emails, the standard way of closing a German business letter	DW, T, F
Mi	Mittwoch	Wednesday	date/time	L, T
Mil.	Million(en)	million(s)		L
Mio.	Million(en)	million(s)		L, T
m.M./m.M.n.	meiner Meinung/meiner Meinung nach	in my opinion		F, DW
Mo	Montag	Monday	date/time	L, T
möbl.	möbliert	furnished	accommodation/real estate	L, T
Mrd.	Milliarde(n)	billion(s) (10^{9})	The German language uses the long scale. German Billion means "trillion" (10^{12}).	L, T
Msp.	Messerspitze	pinch (lit. 'knife tip')	quantity in recipes	T
mtl.	monatlich	monthly	date/time	L, T
mdl.	mündlich	verbal		L
m.ü.M.	Meter über dem Meerespiegel	meters above sea level		L
m.W.	meines Wissens	to my knowledge, as far as I know		L, T, F
MwSt., Mw.-St.	Mehrwertsteuer	VAT, Value-Added Tax	In Switzerland, MWST	L, T
N	Nord(en)	north	compass point	L, T
n.	nach	after		L
näml.	nämlich	namely, viz., i.e.		L, T
n.Chr.	nach Christus	AD, anno Domini	dates	L, T, Da
n.J.	nächsten Jahres	next year		L
NNO	Nordnordost	north-northeast	compass point	T
NNW	Nordnordwest	north-northwest	C	T
NO	Nordosten	northeast	C	L, T
nördl.	nördlich	northern		L
norw.	norwegisch	Norwegian	as an adjective	L
Nr.	Nummer	No., number		L, T
NS	Nachschrift	PS, postscript		T
n.u.Z.	nach unserer Zeitrechnung	CE	dates	T
NW	Nordwest(en)	northwest	compass point	L
O	Ost(en)	east	compass point	L, T, DW
o.	oben	above		L, T, DW
o.	oder	or		L, DW
o.	ohne	without		L, DW
ö	öffentlich	public		DW
o.A.	ohne Altersbeschränkung	approved for all ages (lit. 'without age restriction')	films etc.	T
o.a.	oben angeführt	above-mentioned		L
o.ä.	oder ähnliche	and the like (lit. 'or similar')		L
o.B.	ohne Befund	negative results lit. 'without findings'		L
od.	oder	or		L, T, Da
o.g.	oben genannt	above named		T
OmU	Originalfassung mit Untertiteln	original version with subtitles	films etc.	T
OSO	Ostsüdost	east-southeast	compass point	T
O-Ton	Originalton	original soundtrack	films etc.	T
österr.	österreichisch	Austrian	as an adjective	L
p.Adr.	per Adresse	c/o, care of		L, T
Pf.	Pfarrei; Pfarrer	Parish; Parish priest, parson, pastor		
Pfd.	Pfund	lb., pound	weight	L, T
Pkt.	Punkt	point		L, F
Pkw/PKW	Personenkraftwagen	automobile, car		L, T
Pl.	Platz	square, plaza		L, T
PLZ	Postleitzahl	postal code		L, T
PS	Pferdestärke	metric horsepower		L, T
qkm	Quadratkilometer	square kilometer	obsolete, km^{2} is preferred	L, T
qm	Quadratmeter	square meter	obsolete, m^{2} is preferred	L, T
r.	rechts	right		L, T
RA	Rechtsanwalt	attorney, lawyer, barrister		L, T
Reg.-Bez.	Regierungsbezirk	government district		L, T
R-Gespräch	Retour-Gespräch	collect call, reverse-charge call		T
r.k., r.-k., röm.-kath.	römisch-katholisch	RC, Roman Catholic		L, T
röm.	römisch	Roman	adjective	L, T
S	Süd(en)	south	compass point	L, T, DW
S.	Seite	p., page		T, DW
s.	sich	oneself, yourself	with reflexive verbs	T
s.	siehe	see		L, DW
s.a.	siehe auch	see also		T, Da
Sa	Samstag	Saturday	date/time	L, T
schles.	schlesisch	Silesian	as an adjective	T
schwäb.	schwäbisch	Swabian	as an adjective	T
schweiz.	schweizerisch	Swiss	as an adjective	L, T
sek.	Sekunde	second	date/time	F
SO	Südost(en)	south-east	compass point	L, DW
So	Sonntag	Sunday	date/time	T, DW
s.o.	siehe oben	see above		L, T, DW
sog.	so genannt	so-called		L, T, DW
St.	Sankt	saint		L, T
St.	Stück	(per) piece	pricing	L, T, F
Std.	Stunde	hour		L, F
Str.	Straße	street, road		L, F
StR.	Studienrat	tenured teacher		T
s.u.	siehe unten	see below		L, Da
südd.	süddeutsch	southern German	adjective	?
SW, s/w	schwarz/weiß	black & white	films etc.	T
SW	Südwest(en)	southwest	compass point	L, T
SZ	Schlafzimmer	bedroom	used in accommodation/real estate	F
t	Tonne(n)	ton(s)		L
tägl.	täglich	daily, per day		L, F
Tel.	Telefon	telephone		L, F
TL	Teelöffel	teaspoon	in recipes	F, Da
u.	und	and		T, F, Da
U	Umleitung	detour		L, T
u.a.	und andere	and others		L, T
u.a.	unter anderem	among others		L, T
u.Ä.	und Ähnliches	and the like (lit. 'and similar things')		L, T
u.ä.	und ähnlich	and similarly		T
u.a.m.	und andere(s) mehr	and more, etc.		?
u.A.w.g.	um Antwort wird gebeten	RSVP		L, T
übl./üblw.	üblich/üblicherweise	usual		F
ugs.	umgangssprachlich	colloquially		
usw.	und so weiter	and so on, etc.	note punctuation	L, T, Da, F
u.v.a.(m)	und vieles andere (mehr)	and many others		T
u.U.	unter Umständen	in certain circumstances, possibly		L, T, Da
u.zw.	und zwar	viz., and indeed		L, F
V.	Vers	line, verse		L, T
v.	von	of	used in particular for the nobiliary particle	L
v.a.	vor allem	above all, especially		Da
v.Chr.	vor Christus	BC, before Christ		T, Da
Verf.	Verfasser	author		L, T
verh.	verheiratet	married		T, F
verw.	verwitwet	widowed		L, T
VG	Viele Grüsse	many greetings	casual signoff in email	DW
vgl.	vergleiche	cf., compare, reference		L, T, Da
v.H.	vom Hundert	percent, per 100		L, T
vorm.	vormals	formerly		L, T
vorm.	vormittags	a.m., in the morning	date/time	L, T
v.R.w.	von Rechts wegen	by law		L, T
v.T.	vom Tausend	per mille, per 1000		L, T
v.u.Z.	vor unserer Zeitrechnung	BCE	dates	L, T
W	West(en)	west	compass point	L, T
wstl.	westlich	western		L
w.o.	wie oben	as above		F
WSW	Westsüdwest	west-southwest	compass point	L, T
Wwe/Wwer	Witwe/Witwer	widow/widower		F
Wz	Warenzeichen	trademark		L
Z.	Zahl	number		L, T, DW
Z.	Zeile	line		L, T, DW
z.	zu, zum, zur	at, to		L, T, DW
z.B.	zum Beispiel	e.g., for example		T, Da
z.Hd.	zu Händen, zu Handen	attn., attention of		L, T
Zi.	Zimmer	room		L, T
z.T.	zum Teil	partly, in part		L, Da, F
Ztr.	Zentner	100 kg		L
zur.	zurück	back		L, T
zus.	zusammen	together		L, T
zzgl.	zuzüglich	plus, in addition		T
z.Z./z.Zt.	zur Zeit	at present		L, T, Da

== List of German acronyms ==
An acronym is a general type of abbreviation formed from the initial components of words in a longer name or phrase and pronounced as words. Included in this table are syllable words (German: Silbenkurzwörter), with the fragments used to create the clipping displayed in bold.

Abbreviation	German	English	Notes	Sources
DaF	Deutsch als Fremdsprache	German as a foreign language		
DIN	Deutsches Institut für Normung	German Institute for Standardization		
KaDeWe	Kaufhaus des Westens	large Berlin department store		T, DW
Kripo	Kriminalpolizei	police crime unit, CID (Br.)		
TÜV	Technischer Überwachungsverein	Technical Inspection Association	non-governmental regulatory bodies responsible for product safety; also (colloquially) the mandatory roadworthiness test for motor vehicles (cf. MOT test).	
Jusos	Jungsozialisten	Young Socialists	youth wing of the Social Democratic Party of Germany	
Kita	Kindertagesstätte or Kindertageseinrichtung	day nursery		
Kripo	Kriminalpolizei	criminal police		
Schiri	Schiedsrichter	referee		
Stabi	Staatsbibliothek	national library		
Trafo	Transformator	transformer	electrical component	
Elko	Elektrolytkondensator	electrolytic capacitor	electronic component	
Mofa	motorisiertes Fahrrad	motorised bicycle	class of light motor vehicle that requires no driving licence	
Vokuhila	vorne kurz, hinten lang	mullet	hairstyle	

== List of German initialisms ==
Acronyms pronounced as individual letters are rather than words are more specifically called initialisms. They are written without periods and retain the grammatical gender of their primary noun.

Abbreviation	German	English	Notes	Ref
AA	Anonyme Alkoholiker	Alcoholics Anonymous		L, DW
AA	Auswärtiges Amt	Foreign Office, State Department		DW
ADAC	Allgemeiner Deutscher Automobil-Club	General German Auto Club	largest auto club in Europe	T
AfD	Alternative für Deutschland	Alternative for Germany	political party	
AG	Aktiengesellschaft	Joint-stock company		
AGB	die Allgemeinen Geschäftsbedingungen	Terms and Conditions (of Use)		
ARD	Arbeitsgemeinschaft der öffentlich-rechtlichen Rundfunkanstalten der Bundesrepublik Deutschland	ARD	broadcaster	
AOK	Allgemeine Ortskrankenkasse	public health insurance		T
ASW	außersinnliche Wahrnehmung	Extrasensory Perception		T
BBk	Deutsche Bundesbank	German Federal Bank		
BGB	Bürgerliches Gesetzbuch	German Civil Code		T
BGH	Bundesgerichtshof	Federal Constitutional Court		
BIP	Bruttoinlandsprodukt	Gross Domestic Product		
BKA	Bundeskriminalamt	Federal Criminal Police Office	Germany's "FBI"	T
BLZ	Bankleitzahl	Bank Code Number		T
BMBF	Bundesministerium für Bildung und Forschung	Federal Ministry of Education and Research		
BMF	Bundesministerium der Finanzen	Federal Ministry of Finance		
BMG	Bundesministerium für Gesundheit	Federal Ministry of Health		
BMI	Bundesministerium des Innern, für Bau und Heimat	Federal Ministry of the Interior, Building and Community		
BMVg	Bundesministerium der Verteidigung	Federal Ministry of Defence		
BMU	Bundesministerium für Umwelt, Naturschutz und nukleare Sicherheit	Federal Ministry of the Environment, Nature Conservation and Nuclear Safety		
BMVI	Bundesministerium für Verkehr und digitale Infrastruktur	Federal Ministry of Transport and Digital Infrastructure		
BMW	Bayerische Motoren Werke	Bavarian Motor Works		
BMZ	Bundesministerium für wirtschaftliche Zusammenarbeit und Entwicklung	Federal Ministry for Economic Cooperation and Development		
BND	Bundesnachrichtendienst	Federal Intelligence Service		
BPOL	Bundespolizei	Federal Police		
BR	Bayrischer Rundfunk	Bavarian Broadcasting		
BRD	Bundesrepublik Deutschland	Federal Republic of Germany		
C&A	Clemens & August	C&A	popular clothing chain	T
CDU	Christlich-Demokratische Union	Christian Democratic Union	political party	
CSU	Christlich-Soziale Union	Christian Social Union	political party	
CVJF	Christlicher Verein Junger Frauen	YWCA	In Switzerland, the YWCA and YMCA merged in 1973 to form Cevi Schweitz	T
CVJM	Christlicher Verein Junger Menschen	YMCA	In Switzerland, the YWCA and YMCA merged in 1973 to form Cevi Schweitz	T
CJK	Creutzfeld-Jakob-Krankheit	Creutzfeldt–Jakob disease		
DAAD	Deutscher Akademischer Austauschdienst	German Academic Exchange Service		
DAG	Deutsche Angestellten-Gewerkschaft	German Salaried Employees' Union	Obsolete, now ver.di	
DB	Deutsche Bahn	German Rail		
DDR	Deutsche Demokratische Republik	German Democratic Republic	The former state of East Germany	
DFB	Deutscher Fußballbund	German Football Association		
DGB	Deutscher Gewerkschaftsbund	German Trade Union Confederation		
DIHK	Deutsche Industrie- und Handelskammer	Association of German Chambers of Industry and Commerce		
DIN	Deutsches Institut für Normung	German Institute for Standard		
DJH	Deutsches Jugendherbergswerk	German Youth Hostel Association		
DKP	Deutsche Kommunistische Partei	German Communist Party		
DM	Deutsche Mark	Deutsche Mark		
DPD	Deutscher Paketdienst	German Package Service	the German "UPS"	
DRK	Deutsches Rotes Kreuz	German Red Cross		
DT	Deutsche Telekom	Deutsche Telekom		
DuÖAV	Deutscher und Österreichischer Alpenverein	German and Austrian Alpine Club	Ceased to exist in 1938; the German Alpine Club and Austrian Alpine Club were later re-established.	
DVU	Deutsche Volksunion	German People's Union	political party	
EEG	Elektroenzephalografie	Electroencephalography	medicine/science/technology	
EKG	Elektrokardiogramm	Electrocardiography	medicine/science/technology	
ETA	Elektrotechnischer Assistent	Electrical technologist		
EU	Europäische Union	European Union		
EZB	Europäische Zentralbank	European Central Bank		
FAZ	Frankfurter Allgemeine Zeitung	Frankfurter Allgemeine Zeitung	Germany's "New York Times"	T
FC	Fußball Club	Football Club		
FCKW	Fluor-Chlor-Kohlenwasserstoff	Chlorofluorocarbon	medicine/science/technology	
FDP	Freie Demokratische Partei	Free Democratic Party	political party	
FH	Fachhochschule	University of Applied Sciences		
FKK	Freikörperkultur	Free body culture	Naturism	
FRA	Frankfurter Flughafen	Frankfurt Airport		
FSK	Freiwillige Selbstkontrolle der Filmwirtschaft	Self-Regulatory Body of the Movie Industry	The German motion picture content rating system	
FU	Freie Universität Berlin	Free University of Berlin		
GG	Grundgesetz für die Bundesrepublik Deutschland	Basic Law for the Federal Republic of Germany	Constitution of Germany	L
GEW	Gewerkschaft Erziehung und Wissenschaft	Education and Science Workers' Union		Not T
GEZ	Gebühreneinzugszentrale der öffentlich-rechtlichen Rundfunkanstalten in der Bundesrepublik Deutschland	Contribution service of ARD, ZDF and Deutschlandradio	Former German agency responsible for collecting mandatory fees for public TV and radio	
GUS	Gemeinschaft Unabhängiger Staaten	Commonwealth of Independent States		
HH	Hansestadt Hamburg	Hamburg	on license plates	
HNO	Hals Nase Ohren	Ear, Nose and Throat	medicine/science/technology	
H+M	Hennes & Mauritz	H&M	popular clothing chain	
HTL, HTLA	Höhere Technische Lehranstalt	Technical school	an engineering-focused secondary school in Austria	not T
HTBLA	Höhere Technische Bundeslehranstalt	Federal Higher Technical Institute	an engineering-focused secondary school in Austria	not T
HTBLuVA	Höhere Technische Bundes-Lehr- und -Versuchsanstalt	Federal Higher Technical Institute for Education and Experimentation	an engineering-focused secondary school in Austria	not T
IFO	Institut für Wirtschaftsforschung	Institute for Economic Research		L
IHK	Industrie- und Handelskammer	Chamber of Industry and Commerce	Regional, cross-industry associations	
IOK	Internationales Olympisches Komitee	International Olympic Committee		
IWF	Internationale Währungsfonds	International Monetary Fund		
JH	Jugendherberge	Youth Hostel		
JVA	Justizvollzugsanstalt	Prisons in Germany		
KfzPflVV	Kraftfahrzeug-Pflichtversicherungsverordnung	Motor vehicle liability insurance	legal	DW
KG	Kommanditgesellschaft	Limited partnership		
KKW	Kernkraftwerk	Nuclear power plant		
KSZE	Konferenz über Sicherheit und Zusammenarbeit in Europa	Commission on Security and Cooperation in Europe		
LG	Landgericht	District Court		DW
MAD	Militärischer Abschirmdienst	Military Counterintelligence Service	Germany's "MI5"	
MdB	Mitglied des Bundestages	Member of the Bundestag	Member of Parliament	
MdL	Mitglied des Landtages	Member of the Landtag	Member of a State Legislature	
MEZ	Mitteleuropäische Zeit	Central European Time		
MP	Maschinenpistole	Machine gun		
MP	Militärpolizei	Military police		
MTA	Medizinische(r) Technische(r) Assistent(in)	Medical Technician		
NN	das Normalnull	sea level		
NOK	Nationales Olympisches Komitee	National Olympic Committee		
NPD	Nationaldemokratische Partei Deutschlands	National Democratic Party of Germany	political party	
NRW	Nordrhein-Westfalen	North Rhine-Westphalia	German state	
OB	Oberbürgermeister	Lord mayor		
ÖBB	Österreichische Bundesbahnen	Austrian Federal Railways		
OF	Originalfassung	original version	film/movies	T
OHG	offene Handelsgesellschaft	General partnership		
ÖPNV	öffentlicher Personennahverkehr	Public transport		
ORF	Österreichischer Rundfunk	Austrian Broadcasting Corporation	broadcaster	
ÖVP	Österreichische Volkspartei	Austrian People's Party	political party	
PDS	Partei des Demokratischen Sozialismus	Party of Democratic Socialism	political party	
PH	Pädagogische Hochschule	School of Education		
PIN	Persönliche Identifikationsnummer	Personal identification number	medicine/science/technology	
RBB	Rundfunk Berlin-Brandenburg	Berlin-Brandenburg Broadcasting		
RNS	Ribonukleinsäure	RNA	medicine/science/technology	
RTL	Radio Télévision Luxembourg	Radio Television Luxembourg	broadcaster	
SB	Selbstbedienung	Self-service	SB-Laden, a self-service store SB-Tankstelle, gas/petrol stations	
SBB	Schweizerische Bundesbahnen	Swiss Federal Railways		T
SPÖ	Sozialdemokratische Partei Österreichs	Social Democratic Party of Austria	political party	
SR	Saarländischer Rundfunk	Radio Saarland	broadcaster	T
SSV	Sommerschlussverkauf	end-of-summer sale		
StGB	Strafgesetzbuch	German Penal Code	legal	T
StVO	Straßenverkehrs-Ordnung	German Highway Code	legal	T
SWR	Südwestrundfunk	Southwest Broadcasting	broadcaster	T
TH	Technische Hochschule	Technical College		
TU	Technische Universität	Technical University		
UB	Universitätsbibliothek	University Library		
UFO	unidentifiziertes Flugobjekt	Unidentified flying object		
UKW	Ultrakurzwellen	FM, Very High Frequency	medicine/science/technology	
UNO	Vereinte Nationen	United Nations		
VAE	Vereinigte Arabische Emirate	United Arab Emirates		
VDE	Verband der Elektrotechnik, Elektronik und Informationstechnik	Association of Electrical Engineering, Electronics and Information Technology	medicine/science/technology	
VELKD	Vereinigte Evangelisch-Lutheranische Kirche Deutschlands	United Evangelical Lutheran Church of Germany		
VHS	Volkshochschule	Folk high school		
WAA	Wiederaufbereitungsanlage	Nuclear reprocessing plant	medicine/science/technology	L
WDR	Westdeutscher Rundfunk	West German Radio	broadcaster	
WEZ	Westeuropäische Zeit	Western European Time		
WG	Wohngemeinschaft	Co-living	unrelated people sharing a flat, apartment, or house	L
WM	Weltmeisterschaft	World championship		L
WS	Wintersemester	Winter semester		
WSV	Winterschlussverkauf	Winter sale		
ZDF	Zweites Deutsches Fernsehen	Second German Television Network	broadcaster	
KV	Kassenärztliche Vereinigung			
ZPO	Zivilprozessordnung	Civil procedure (divorce, etc.)	legal	
