= Western Power Pool =

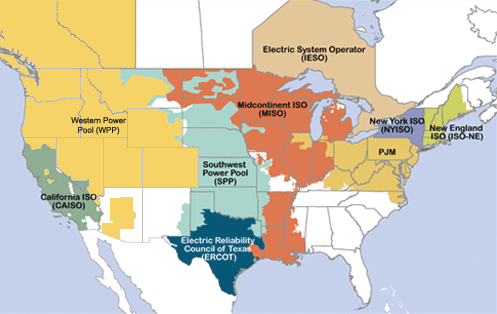
ISOs and RTOs of North America as of 2024

The Western Power Pool (WPP) is a group of electric utilities in western Canada and the Western United States that shares resources. Formerly Northwest Power Pool (NWPP), the organization formed in 1941 and rebranded to WPP in 2022.

In 2023, FERC approved the Western Resource Adequacy Program (WRAP), a Western reliability planning and compliance program. As of 2023, the program has 22 participating utilities. The WRAP is governed by an independent board at WPP and operated by the Southwest Power Pool.

== See also ==
- RTOs and ISOs
- California Independent System Operator (CAISO)
- Western Electricity Coordinating Council (WECC)
