= PJM Interconnection =

Electric grid coordinator in the northeastern US

PJM Interconnection LLC
- Industry: Regional transmission organization
- Founded: 1927; 99 years ago
- Headquarters: Valley Forge, Pennsylvania, US
- Area served: Delaware, Illinois, Indiana, Kentucky, Maryland, Michigan, New Jersey, North Carolina, Ohio, Pennsylvania, Tennessee, Virginia, West Virginia, and the District of Columbia, US
- Key people: David Mills (President, CEO)
- Members: 1,110
- Website: www.pjm.com

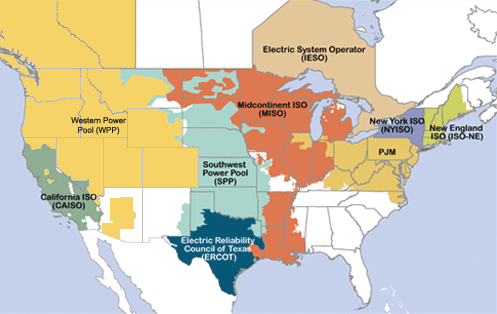
ISOs and RTOs of North America as of 2024

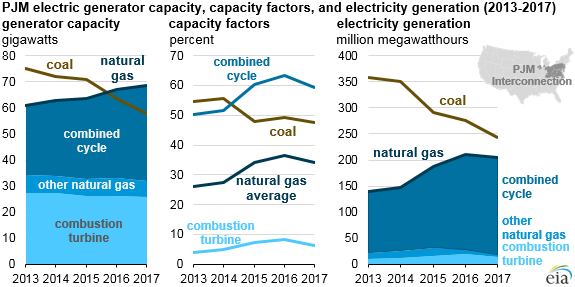
PJM coal and natural gas electricity generation, 2013–2017

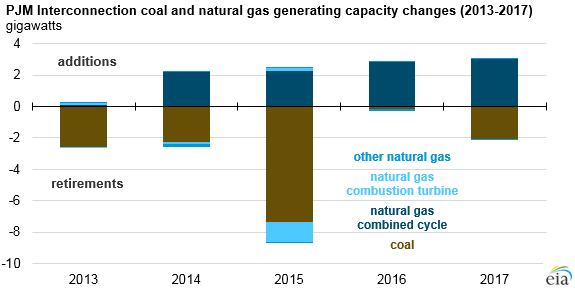
During 2013–2017, the PJM Interconnection increased the use of natural gas combined cycle plants while reducing the use of coal-fired plants

PJM Interconnection LLC (PJM) is a regional transmission organization (RTO) in the United States. It is part of the Eastern Interconnection grid operating an electric transmission system serving all or parts of Delaware, Illinois, Indiana, Kentucky, Maryland, Michigan, New Jersey, North Carolina, Ohio, Pennsylvania, Tennessee, Virginia, West Virginia, and the District of Columbia. PJM is the largest power grid operator in the United States, serving 67 million customers from Chicago to New Jersey.

PJM, headquartered in Valley Forge, Pennsylvania, was the world's largest competitive wholesale electricity market until the development of the European Integrated Energy Market in the 2000s. More than 1,000 companies are members of PJM, which has 182 gigawatts of generating capacity. With 1,436 electric power generators and 88,333 miles (142,158 km) of transmission lines, PJM delivered over 800 terawatt-hours of electricity in 2024.

Started in 1927, the pool was renamed the Pennsylvania-New Jersey-Maryland Interconnection (PJM) in 1956. The organization continues to integrate additional utility transmission systems into its operations. The Federal Energy Regulatory Commission (FERC) regulates PJM, and approves its open access transmission tariff for the wholesale electricity market.

In 2026, PJM is anticipating future supply shortages due to expected 5% annual demand growth (compared to no growth from 2005-2020) from new data centers, combined with supply constraints from shutdowns of many generation plants for environmental or economic reasons, and the difficulty of timely permitting of new power plants.

== History ==
In 1927, the Public Service Electric and Gas Company, Philadelphia Electric Company, and Pennsylvania Power & Light Company formed a power pool called the Pennsylvania-New Jersey Interconnection. The purpose of the power pool was to dispatch electric generating plants on a lowest cost basis, thereby reducing the electric costs for all members of the pool.

After Baltimore Gas and Electric Company and General Public Utilities joined in 1956, the pool was renamed the Pennsylvania-New Jersey-Maryland Interconnection, or PJM.

=== FERC Orders 888, 889, and 2000 ===
From 1996 to 1999, the FERC issued a series of decisions that led to the restructuring of the US electric utility industry. The FERC's intention in doing so was to open the wholesale power market to new players, with the hope that spurring competition would save consumers $4 to $5 billion per year and encourage technical innovation in the industry.

Order No. 888 (Promoting Wholesale Competition Through Open Access Non-discriminatory Transmission Services by Public Utilities; Recovery of Stranded Costs by Public Utilities and Transmitting Utilities) directed utility owners of interstate transmission lines to provide FERC with proposed terms (including fee schedules, or "tariffs") under which new market participants would be granted open, non-discriminatory access to move (or "wheel") power through the existing transmission grid. FERC also ordered electric utilities to functionally separate transmission operations from their power plant and power marketing businesses. This unbundling of functions was aimed at eliminating conflicts of interest that might exist when the same company owned both the transmission system and the generating plants.

Order No. 889 (Open Access Same-Time Information System) was designed to level the playing field further. It required the creation of an electronic system to ensure that all participants in the wholesale power market—new players and traditional electric utilities—had access to the same information about available transmission capacity and prices.

FERC also endorsed the concept of appointing independent system operators (ISOs) to coordinate, control, and monitor the operation of electrical power systems, often within a single US state; this function was traditionally the responsibility of vertically integrated electric utility companies. PJM became an ISO in 1997. The concept of an independent system operator evolved into that of regional transmission organizations (RTOs). FERC intended that all US companies owning interstate electric transmission lines would place those facilities under the control of an RTO. In its Order No. 2000 (Regional Transmission Organizations), issued in 1999, FERC specified the minimum capabilities that an RTO should possess for the competitive generation market to function as intended. PJM was designated an RTO by FERC in 2001.

=== Deregulation and expansion, 2002 ===
In April 2002, Allegheny Power (AP) was the first external control area to join the PJM RTO as a market participant; "PJM Classic" and AP operated as a single control area, filling the roles of balancing authority, interchange authority, market operator, and transmission operator.

=== The Northeast Blackout of 2003 ===
During the Northeast Blackout of 2003, the transmission systems within the PJM operations area largely remained operational and were not affected by the power failure. When the grid separated, a small portion of the Public Service Electric & Gas of New Jersey zone electrically separated from the Eastern Interconnection due to over-frequency relay operations.

=== Deregulation and expansion, 2004-present ===
In May 2004, Commonwealth Edison (ComEd) joined PJM as a separate balancing authority operating under the RTO. PJM managed the two territories in a single market through a mechanism known as "the pathway": a set of firm contracts that transferred energy from ComEd through third-party control areas to the eastern PJM markets and beyond. In October 2004, American Electric Power (AEP) and Dayton Power & Light (DPL) joined PJM, which allowed PJM to collapse back into a single control area.

In January 2005, Duquesne Light Co. (DLCO) joined PJM. In May 2005, Dominion Virginia Power joined PJM, extending the southern border to North Carolina. FirstEnergy was added to PJM in June 2011, expanding the footprint across northern Ohio to the Michigan border. Areas of Ohio and Kentucky near Cincinnati covered by Duke Energy joined the PJM footprint in January 2012. In 2018, the Ohio Valley Electric Corporation (OVEC) integrated into PJM.

In December 2025, it was reported by Cleveland.com that for the first time, PJM couldn't purchase 100 percent of the power it needs in its future electricity auction. Rolling blackouts may occur in 2026. Skyrocketing capacity costs, along with the shortfall, point to a looming crisis of both availability and affordability. The auction this year with total capacity costs are above $16 billion. The 2024 auction cost $2.2 billion. It went up eight times from the previous year.

In the age of hyperscale data centers, PJM has faced increasing criticism for its connection policies; federal regulators are taking an increased look at the organization, and it is increasing the connection of generation infrastructure to meet demand. American Electric Power suggested in a shareholder meeting that it was considering leaving the organization because of its growing inability to meet demands.

== Transmission system planning and upgrades ==
PJM uses a fifteen-year planning horizon for planning transmission system upgrades. Under PJM's Regional Transmission Expansion Planning (RTEP) process, PJM considers forecasts of load growth and additions of demand response, interconnection requests for new and planned retirements of existing generating plants, and possible solutions to mitigate congestion on the transmission system. If the upgrade involves the construction of a new transmission line, local siting decisions involving the route of the new line are determined by the owner of the line and the state government.

=== Generation types ===
As the largest RTO in North America, PJM plays a significant role in reducing grid emissions. PJM has "facilitating decarbonization" as one of its three strategic pillars.

PJM presents a pie chart of its energy sources hourly on its main website page. It also provides access to an historical hour by hour database of generation by fuel type, summarized here for 2022:

PJM generation by source (MWh) as of 2022
Carbon-emitting sources		Non-carbon-emitting sources	
167,111,041	Coal	15,964,309	Hydro
331,532,269	Gas	271,360,198	Nuclear
4,055,748	Multiple fuels	32,161,464	Wind
2,796,223	Oil	7,153,851	Solar
1,376,685	Other fuels	5,383,905	Other renewables
506,871,966	Total emitting sources	332,023,727	Total non-emitting sources
60.4%	% from emitting sources	39.6%	% from non-emitting sources

=== Renewable energy backlog ===
As of 2022 PJM has experienced difficulty in evaluating and integrating proposed new renewable energy projects into its system. This has resulted in delays in utilization of significant projects that are being built or are planned, inhibiting progress toward meeting then-President Biden's goal of 100 percent carbon-free electricity by 2035. Transition to renewables may also be slowed by features of the PJM pricing models. In an August 2021 letter, the PJM PIEOUG (Public Interest and Environmental Organizations User Group) expressed concern that the capacity market resulted in "unintentional subsidies for fossil-fueled resources or barriers to low-carbon supply."

Further, slow connection of new generating capacity has significantly increased interconnection charges to PJM customers. A 2025 report found PJM's slow pace of interconnecting new generating capacity in recent years will cost consumers "as much as $7 billion" in the coming year, due to higher prices in PJM's latest capacity auction. Since 2019, PJM has charged almost triple (increase from well under $100/kW to well over $200/kW) what it charged to interconnect before 2019.

Aware of the large backlog and slow pace in processing generation interconnection (GI) requests, PJM requested that FERC approve significant changes to its interconnection process, described by PJM as: "...a comprehensive reform of the PJM interconnection process designed to more efficiently and timely process New Service Requests by transitioning from a serial 'first-come, first-served' queue approach to a 'first-ready, first-served' cycle approach utilized by other regional transmission organizations (RTOs) and stand-alone transmission providers."

FERC approved the new GI process on November 29, 2022. The PJM press release announcing FERC approval states "The proposal was widely supported by PJM stakeholders, who had worked with PJM to develop the new rules since the April 2021 inception of the Interconnection Process Reform Task Force." However, one major stakeholder, the Organization of PJM States, in its comments on the PJM proposal, indicated its recommendation for FERC approval was despite the process being slow, and based on the expectation that much more was to be done to speed up interconnections.

In 2025, several states introduced bills requiring greater transparency into PJM and how utilities cast their PJM votes.

== Pricing ==
Prices are set in PJM by its operation of two markets: an energy market and a capacity market.

=== Energy market ===
The energy market sets prices paid to generators by consumers for electrical energy delivered on the PJM grid. The price is determined by using nodal pricing, also known as locational marginal pricing. PJM publishes a map of energy price levels throughout its area.

=== Capacity market ===
According to PJM, their capacity market, called the Reliability Pricing Model, ensures long-term grid reliability. Market participants are paid for their promise to be able to generate electricity (or reduce demand) three years in the future. FERC approved a December 2022 PJM proposal to adjust its capacity market operations. However, in a February 21, 2023, press release FERC noted "continuing disputes and frequent complaints about how PJM operates its capacity markets from an array of stakeholders" and FERC stated it will "examine the PJM Interconnection, L.L.C. capacity market and how best to guarantee it achieves the objective of ensuring resource adequacy at just and reasonable rates". In response to this stated FERC intent, and in the belief "near-term changes to the Reliability Pricing Model (RPM) are necessary to ensure that PJM can maintain resource adequacy into the future", the PJM board "decided to implement the Critical Issue Fast Path (CIFP) accelerated stakeholder process mechanism to pursue further stakeholder consensus that would inform a PJM Board decision on a potential FERC filing targeted for October 1, 2023".

The capacity PJM purchases (the cost of which it passes along to customers) is the amount it needs to serve the expected peak load, plus a margin to cover potential delivery interruptions, such as generator or transmission outages. The peak load in 2022 was 147,820 MW on July 20. PJM forecasts peak load to increase to 160,971 MW in 2033 and reach 167,567 MW in 2038. As of June 2022, PJM's stated capacity was 198,152 MW, which is substantially greater than any peak load ever experienced, or any peak load forecast. One analysis concluded that PJM has been purchasing capacity significantly in excess of load plus target reserve margins, which resulted in "consumers paying for more capacity than needed, retaining older capacity that is no longer needed and should be retired, and acquiring new power plants that are not yet needed." In its "State of the Market Report for PJM" for 2022, The PJM Independent Market Monitor found that noncompetitive outcomes in the capacity market "led to customers being overcharged by a combined $1.454 billion" in the two years analyzed.
