= Power pool =

Power pooling is a mechanism for interchange of power between two or more utilities that provide or generate electricity on the same electrical grid. The purpose of pools is to balance electrical load over a larger network (electrical grid) than a single utility. For the exchange of power between two utilities, they sign an interchange agreement, but signing an interchange agreement for each pair of utilities within a system can be difficult, especially when several large utilities are interconnected. Thus, it is more advantageous to form a power pool with a single agreement that all join. That agreement provides established terms and conditions for pool members and is generally more complex than a bilateral agreement.

In one model, the power pool, formed by the utilities, has a control dispatch office that administers the pool. All tasks related to the transfer of power and the settlement of disputes are assigned to the pool administrator.

The formation of power pools provides the following potential advantages:

1. Decrease in operating costs
2. Saving in reserve capacity requirements
3. Help from pool in unit commitment
4. Minimization of costs of maintenance scheduling
5. More reliable operation

The formation of a power pool is associated with several problems and constraints. These include:

1. Pool agreement may be very complex
2. Costs associated with establishing a central dispatch office and the needed communication and computational facilities
3. The opposition of pool members to give up their rights to engage in independent transactions outside the pool.
4. The complexity of dealing with regulatory authorities, if the pool operates in more than one state.
5. The effort by each member of the pool to maximize its savings.

Power pooling is very important for extending energy control over a large area served by multiple utilities.

== Examples ==
- Western Power Pool
- Southwest Power Pool
- Southern African Power Pool
- West African Power Pool
- Eastern Africa Power Pool

== See also ==
- Wheeling (electric power transmission)
