= Regional transmission organization (North America) =

Electric power coordinator

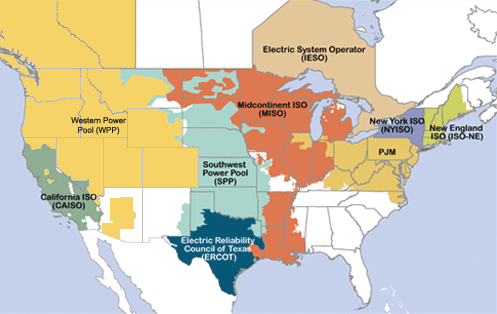
ISOs and RTOs of North America as of 2024

A regional transmission organization (RTO) in the United States is an electric power transmission system operator (TSO) that coordinates, controls, and monitors a multi-state electric grid. The transfer of electricity between states is considered interstate commerce, and electric grids spanning multiple states are therefore regulated by the Federal Energy Regulatory Commission (FERC). The voluntary creation of RTOs was initiated by FERC in December 1999. The purpose of the RTO is to promote economic efficiency, reliability, and non-discriminatory practices while reducing government oversight.

== Definition ==
A regional transmission organization (RTO) in the United States is an electric power transmission system operator (TSO) that coordinates, controls, and monitors a multi-state electric grid. The transfer of electricity between states is considered interstate commerce, and electric grids spanning multiple states are therefore regulated by the Federal Energy Regulatory Commission (FERC).

An independent system operator (ISO) is similarly an organization formed at the recommendation of FERC. In the areas where an ISO is established, it coordinates, controls, and monitors the operation of the electrical power system, usually within a single US state, but sometimes encompassing multiple states. RTOs typically perform the same functions as ISOs, but cover a larger geographic area.

The two are similar, with an RTO being more clearly defined and born out of the concept of electrical grid reliability. The delineation between an ISO and an RTO is subtle to some and quite specific to others, as the similarities in the table below illustrate:

Various definitions from web-based glossaries
ISO	RTO
"...an organization formed at the direction or recommendation of the [FERC]..."	"...designated by the [FERC] to direct operation of the regional electric transmission grid in its area..."
"...a neutral party responsible for the management and control of the electric transmission grid in a state or region..."	"...coordinates, controls and monitors an electricity transmission grid that is larger with much higher voltages than the typical power company's distribution grid..."
"...operates an electric-transmission system that it does not own..."	"...coordinates power generation and transmission within an integrated regional market..."
"...an independent, Federally regulated entity..."	"...an independent governing body..."
"...ensure[s] the safety and reliability of the electric system..."	"...[responsible] for electric transmission grid operations, short-term electric reliability and transmission services within a multi-state region..."
"...for the purpose of providing open access to retail and wholesale markets for supply..."	"...serve as the independent operator of the regional electric market..."

In short, an ISO operates a region's electricity grid, administers the region's wholesale electricity markets, and provides reliability planning for the region's bulk electricity system. Today's RTOs do the same thing with an added component of greater responsibility for the transmission network, as established by the FERC.

== Background ==
"Independent System Operators grew out of Orders Nos. 888/889 where the Commission suggested the concept of an Independent System Operator as one way for existing tight power pools to satisfy the requirement of providing non-discriminatory access to transmission. Subsequently, in Order No. 2000, the Commission encouraged the voluntary formation of Regional Transmission Organizations to administer the transmission grid on a regional basis throughout North America (including Canada). Order No. 2000 delineated twelve characteristics and functions that an entity must satisfy in order to become a Regional Transmission Organization."

=== FERC Orders 888 & 889 ===
In April 1996, the Federal Energy Regulatory Commission (FERC) issued two orders that changed the landscape of how electricity is generated, transmitted, and distributed throughout North America. Prior to these rulings, generated power and the subsequent energy provided to customers by local service providers was owned and controlled by single entities who often owned the entire generation, transmission, and distribution assets. Because these companies controlled the retail delivery of the energy from generation through their own power lines, consumers had little to no choice regarding whose electricity they were buying.

In economic terms, this structure constituted an impediment for new providers who would want to generate power, move energy, or provide retail electricity to individual consumers.

Order No. 888 addressed "Promoting Wholesale Competition Through Open Access Non-discriminatory Transmission Services by Public Utilities; Recovery of Stranded Costs by Public Utilities and Transmitting Utilities." and Order No. 889 added and amended existing rules "...establishing and governing an Open Access Same-time Information System (OASIS) (formerly real-time information networks) and prescribing standards of conduct."

==== Order No. 888 ====
Order No. 888 is often cited as the "Deregulation" of the electric industry. Deregulation, however, is not an accurate term. In actuality, the electricity industry is still regulated, depending on the region, by a series of federal, state, and local agencies and various public commissions. Order No. 888 is substantial in scope. Relative to this article, however, it defined two key elements:

1. An acknowledgment that barriers to competitive wholesale markets may exist and that those barriers must be removed
2. Permit utilities to recover stranded costs associated with providing open access to transmission

"The legal and policy cornerstone of these rules is to remedy undue discrimination in access to the monopoly owned transmission wires that control whether and to whom electricity can be transported in interstate commerce. A second critical aspect of the rules is to address recovery of the transition costs of moving from a monopoly-regulated regime to one in which all sellers can compete on a fair basis and in which electricity is more competitively priced."

In addressing #1 above, Order No. 888 defined the fundamental purpose of an ISO to "…operate the transmission systems of public utilities in a manner that is independent of any business interest in sales or purchases of electric power by those utilities." The order did not mandate or require the establishment of ISOs. Rather, in an attempt to comply with the FERC's order, groups of participants (or "Power Pools" composed of generators, transmission providers and utilities) partnered, and proposed to the FERC, for the right to establish designs of independent system operations.

Through negotiation, collaboration and legal challenges, the first ISOs to emerge included California ISO, PJM Interconnection, New York ISO and New England ISO. Each proposed a slightly different market design according to their collaborative results. In order to facilitate competitive wholesale markets, Order No. 888 specified the unbundling of a utility's operations separating generation and transmission and distribution.

"… all public utilities that own, operate or control interstate transmission facilities to offer network and point-to- point transmission services (and ancillary services) to all eligible buyers and sellers in wholesale bulk power markets, and to take transmission service for their own uses under the same rates, terms and conditions offered to others. In other words, it requires non-discriminatory (comparable) treatment for all eligible users of the monopolists' transmission facilities. The non-discriminatory services required by Order No. 888, known as open access services, are reflected in a pro forma open access tariff contained in the Rule. The Rule also requires functional separation of the utilities' transmission and power marketing functions (also referred to as functional unbundling) and the adoption of an electric transmission system information network."

In addressing #2 above, the original order (and subsequent clarification by the FERC) allows utilities, under certain defined circumstances, to seek extra-contractual recovery of stranded costs. The FERC continues to receive rehearing petitions regarding stranded cost recovery as it has clearly placed the importance on remedying what it terms as "undue discrimination" at the forefront.

Order No. 888 was not met without objection among the public, academics and industry participants. Requests for rehearing and/or clarification were filed by 137 entities after the order's issuance. The majority agreed with the FERC's assertion for the need to harness the benefits of competitive electricity markets.

==== Order No. 889 ====
Order No. 889 amended rules establishing and governing the Open Access Same-time Information System (OASIS) (formerly real-time information networks) and prescribed standards of conduct for its use and access. Subsequent orders provided clarifications, standards and protocols.

"Under this final rule, each public utility (or its agent) that owns, controls, or operates facilities used for the transmission of electric energy in interstate commerce will be required to create or participate in an OASIS that will provide open access transmission customers and potential open access transmission customers with information, provided by electronic means, about available transmission capacity, prices, and other information that will enable them to obtain open access non-discriminatory transmission service. This final rule requires (1) each public utility subject to the rule to implement standards of conduct to functionally separate transmission and wholesale power merchant functions and (2) the creation of a basic OASIS system."

=== FERC Order 2000 ===
Where as Order No. 888 provided for an entity (an ISO) to facilitate open access, it was not written with the intent to establish one. FERC Order No. 2000 was:

"The Federal Energy Regulatory Commission (Commission) is amending its regulations under the Federal Power Act (FPA) to advance the formation of Regional Transmission Organizations (RTOs). The regulations require that each public utility that owns, operates, or controls facilities for the transmission of electric energy in interstate commerce make certain filings with respect to forming and participating in an RTO. The Commission also codifies minimum characteristics and functions that a transmission entity must satisfy in order to be considered an RTO."

Issued by the FERC on December 29, 1999, Order No. 2000 codified what it means to be an RTO including its minimum characteristics, functions and ratemaking policy. The order also stated its commitment toward open architecture with a stated goal that an RTO "...be designed so that they can evolve over time." The order still, however, does not mandate that a new entity called an RTO be created, nor does it mandate that an entity call itself an RTO to comply with the FERC's order.

"In the Final Rule, we noted that the characteristics and functions could be satisfied by different organizational forms, such as ISOs, transcos, combinations of the two, or even new organizational forms not yet discussed in the industry or proposed to the Commission. Likewise, the Commission did not propose a "cookie cutter" organizational format for regional transmission institutions or the establishment of fixed or specific regional boundaries"

== Independent system operators (ISOs) ==
An independent system operator (ISO) is an organization formed at the direction or recommendation of the Federal Energy Regulatory Commission (FERC). In the areas where an ISO is established, it coordinates, controls and monitors the operation of the electrical power system, usually within a single US State, but sometimes encompassing multiple states.

"The PJM, New England and New York ISOs were established on the platform of existing tight power pools. It appears that the principal motivation for creating ISOs in these situations was the Order No. 888 requirement that there be a single systemwide transmission tariff for tight pools. In contrast, the establishment of the California ISO and the ERCOT ISO was the direct result of mandates by state governments. The Midwest ISO, which is not yet operational, is unique. It was neither required by government nor based on an existing institution. Two states in the region subsequently required utilities in their states to participate in either a Commission-approved ISO (Illinois and Wisconsin), or sell their transmission assets to an independent transmission company that would operate under a regional ISO (Wisconsin)."

Similar to an RTO, the primary difference is that ISOs either do not meet the minimum requirements specified by FERC to hold the designation of RTO or that the ISO has not petitioned FERC for the status.

Electric utilities that are located within the United States and engage in interstate commerce fall under FERC authority. Not all utilities are members of ISOs. All utilities and ISOs are responsible to meet the compliance of a larger organization called the North American Electric Reliability Corporation (NERC), which overlays the entire FERC footprint and includes a Mexican utility and several Canadian utilities. As such, international reciprocity is commonplace, and rules or recommendations introduced by FERC often are voluntarily accepted by NERC members outside of FERC's jurisdiction. Therefore, one Canadian Province is a member of a US-based RTO, while two others function as an Electric System Operator (ESO), an organization essentially equal to a US-based ISO.

Within the United States one ISO, and its participating utilities, does not fall under FERC authority: The Electric Reliability Council of Texas (ERCOT). ERCOT falls under the authority of NERC and operates a reliability function, separate from its market function, in order to comply with NERC requirements.

ISOs act as a marketplace operator in wholesale power, resulting from FERC order No. 888. Most are set up as nonprofit corporations using governance models approved by FERC and/or regional or local commissions.

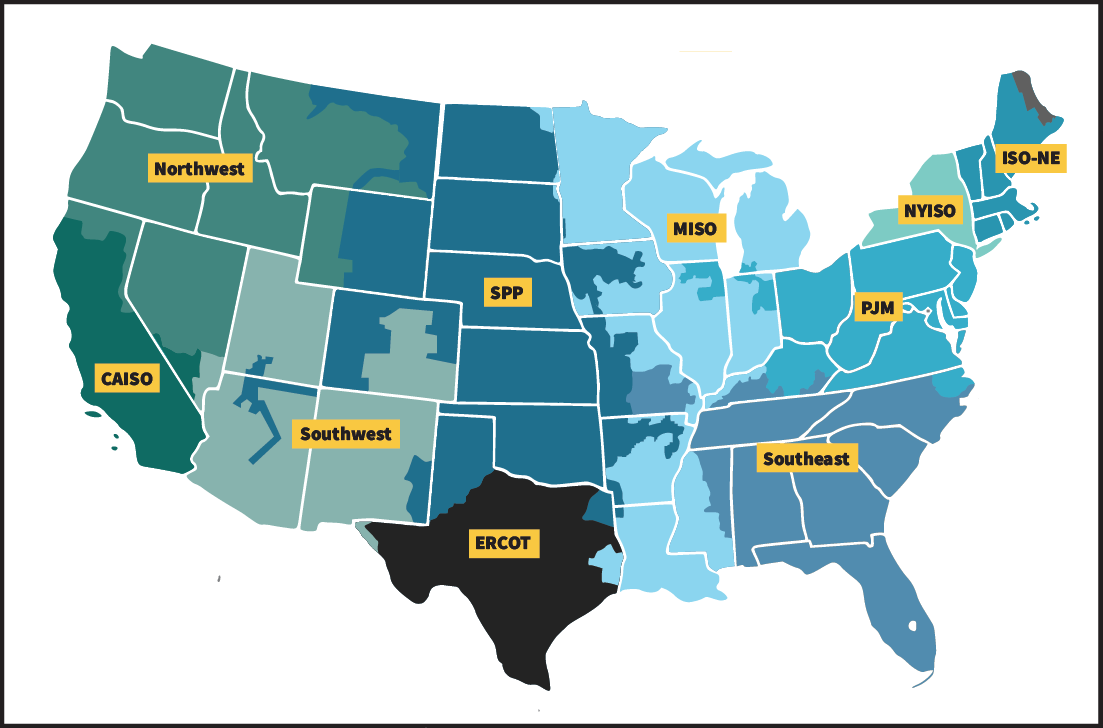
US electricity markets as of 2025

As of 2025, there were seven ISOs/RTOs within continental USA and two in Canada:

- CAISO – California ISO
- NYISO – New York ISO
- Electric Reliability Council of Texas (ERCOT); also a Regional Reliability Council
- Midcontinent Independent System Operator – Midcontinent ISO
- ISO-NE – ISO New England
- SPP – Southwest Power Pool
- PJM – Pennsylvania-New Jersey-Maryland Interconnection
- AESO – Alberta Electric System Operator
- Independent Electricity System Operator (IESO); operates the Hydro One transmission grid for Ontario, Canada

The New Brunswick System Operator (NBSO) was dissolved when New Brunswick's new Electricity Act went into effect in October 2013.

There are regions of the United States where ISOs do not exist. Consequently, the utilities do not engage in wholesale power markets. The Pacific Northwest, and states east of California and west of the Dakotas, Nebraska, Kansas and Texas largely do not participate. The majority of Southeastern states do not participate in wholesale markets. While these regions must conform to open access as mandated by FERC, the power exchanges between utilities is mostly facilitated through bilateral contracts and power purchase agreements. FERC distinguishes three such traditional electricity markets:

- Northwest includes Western Power Pool, the Rocky Mountain Power Area, and Nevada within the Western Electricity Coordinating Council (WECC);
- Southeast bilateral market includes all or parts of Florida, Georgia, Alabama, Mississippi, North Carolina, South Carolina, Missouri and Tennessee within the SERC Reliability Corporation;
- Southwest market includes Arizona, New Mexico, Southern Nevada Power Area within WECC.

== Regional transmission organizations (RTOs) ==
An RTO is an organization formed at the approval of the Federal Energy Regulatory Commission (FERC). In the areas where an RTO is established, it coordinates, controls and monitors the operation of the electrical power system, usually within a single US State, but sometimes encompassing multiple states. The official definition for an RTO: "An entity that is independent from all generation and power marketing interests and has exclusive responsibility for grid operations, short-term reliability, and transmission service within a region."

The designation of an RTO is largely one of scope. An organization wanting to achieve RTO status must petition the FERC for approval, and meet 4 minimum characteristics and 8 minimum functions:

=== Characteristics ===
1. Independence – an RTO should be independent from its market participants in financial interests, decision-making, and tariff-setting.
2. Scope and regional configuration – the region for an RTO should be chosen to achieve the necessary regulatory, reliability, operational, and competitive benefits.
3. Operational authority – an RTO must have the authority to control its transmission facilities (e.g. switching elements in and out of service, monitoring and controlling voltage) and must be the security coordinator for its region.
4. Short-term reliability – an RTO must ensure the region meets the NERC reliability standards or alert FERC if it does not.

=== Functions ===
1. Tariff administration and design – in order to ensure non-discriminatory transmission service, an RTO must be the sole provider of transmission service and sole administrator of its own open access tariff.
2. Congestion management – an RTO must ensure the development and operation of market mechanisms to manage transmission congestion.
3. Parallel path flow – an RTO must develop and implement procedures to address parallel path flow issues within its region and with other regions.
4. Ancillary services – an RTO must serve as the supplier of last resort for all ancillary services and determine if the minimum amount of ancillary services have been supplied according to FERC Order No. 888.
5. OASIS and Total Transmission Capability (TTC) and Available Transmission Capability (ATC) – an RTO must be the single OASIS site administrator for all transmission facilities under its control and independently calculate TTC and ATC.
6. Market monitoring – an RTO must monitor market behavior and report market power abuses and market design flaws to FERC.
7. Planning and expansion – an RTO must have ultimate responsibility for both transmission planning and expansion within its region that will enable it to provide efficient, reliable and non-discriminatory service.
8. Interregional coordination – an RTO must coordinate its activities with other regions.

Only electric utilities that are located within the United States fall under FERC authority, but a larger organization called the North American Electric Reliability Corporation (NERC) overlays the entire FERC footprint and also includes a Mexican utility and several Canadian utilities. As such, international reciprocity is commonplace, and rules or recommendations introduced by FERC often are voluntarily accepted by NERC members outside of FERC's jurisdiction. Therefore, one Canadian Province is a member of a U.S.-based RTO, while two others function as an Electric System Operator (ESO), an organization essentially equal to a U.S.-based ISO.

Some ISOs and RTOs also act as a marketplace in wholesale power, especially since the electricity market restructuring of the late 1990s. Most are set up as nonprofit corporations using governance models developed by FERC.

FERC Orders 888 and 889 defined how independent power producers (IPPs) and power marketers would be allowed fair access to transmission systems, and mandated the implementation of the Open Access Same-Time Information System (OASIS) to facilitate the fair handling of transactions between electric power transmission suppliers and their customers.

TSOs in Europe cross state and provincial borders like RTOs.

=== History ===
RTOs were created by the Federal Energy Regulatory Commission (FERC) as a way to handle the challenges associated with the operation of multiple interconnected independent power supply companies. FERC describes this as a voluntary system. The traditional model of the vertically integrated electric utility with a transmission system designed to serve its own customers worked extremely well for decades. As dependence on a reliable supply of electricity grew and electricity was transported over increasingly greater distances, power pools were formed and interconnections developed. Transactions were relatively few and generally planned well in advance.

In the 1990s, as states and regions in the United States established wholesale competition for electricity, groups of utilities and their federal and state regulators began forming independent transmission operators that would ensure equal access to the power grid for non-utility firms, enhance the reliability of the transmission system and operate wholesale electricity markets. Some policy makers and academics projected that the electrical power industry would ultimately experience deregulation. RTOs were conceived as a way to handle the vastly increased number of transactions that take place in a competitive environment. About a dozen states decided to deregulate, but some pulled back following the California electricity crisis of 2000 and 2001.

=== Purpose ===
RTOs ensure three key free marketer drivers: 1) open access and non-discriminatory services, 2) the continued reliability of a system unequaled anywhere else, and 3) multiple transmission charges that will not negate the savings to the end-use customer. Critics of RTOs counter that the wholesale electricity market as operated through the RTOs is in fact raising prices beyond what would obtain in a truly competitive situation, and that the organizations themselves add a needless layer of bureaucracy. While the original intention was for the RTOs to remain an independent, non-profit organization and were given nearly autonomous control of their service area. The primary committees, and a majority of participant committees are almost entirely represented by investor owned utilities and have eroded States power and Federal authority.

The RTO concept provides for separation of generation and transmission and elimination of pancaked rates, and it encourages a diverse membership including public power. Wider membership contributes to the establishment of an entity with the size necessary to function as an RTO.

Seven grid operators, either independent system operators (ISOs) or RTOs, coordinate the power grid to ensure the reliable delivery of two-thirds of the electricity used in the United States to two-thirds of its population. Most are overseen by FERC.

ISOs and RTOs coordinate generation and transmission across wide geographic regions, matching generation to the load instantaneously to keep supply and demand for electricity in balance. The grid operators forecast load and schedule generation to assure that sufficient generation and back-up power is available in case demand rises or a power plant or power line is lost. They also operate wholesale electricity markets that enable participants to buy and sell electricity on a day-ahead or a real-time spot market basis. These markets provide electricity suppliers with more options for meeting consumer needs for power at the lowest possible cost.

ISO/RTOs provide non-discriminatory transmission access, facilitating competition among wholesale suppliers to improve transmission service and provide fair electricity prices. Across large regions, they schedule the use of transmission lines; manage the interconnection of new generation and monitor the markets to ensure fairness and neutrality for all participants. Providing these services regionally is more efficient than providing them on a smaller-scale, utility by utility.

Today's power industry is far more than a collection of power plants and transmission lines. Maintaining an effective grid requires management of three different but related sets of flows – the flow of energy across the grid; the exchange of information about power flows and the equipment it moves across; and the flow of money between producers, marketers, transmission owners, buyers and others. ISO/RTOs play an essential role in managing and enhancing all three of these flows.

=== In North America ===
As of 2023, there were nine ISO/RTOs operating in North America:

- Alberta Electric System Operator (AESO) – ISO
- California Independent System Operator (CAISO) – ISO
- Electric Reliability Council of Texas (ERCOT) – ISO
- Midcontinent Independent System Operator, Inc. (MISO) – RTO
- ISO New England (ISO-NE) – RTO
- New York Independent System Operator (NYISO) – RTO
- Ontario Independent Electricity System Operator (IESO) – ISO
- PJM Interconnection (PJM) – RTO
- Southwest Power Pool (SPP) – RTO

=== Non-RTO transmission organizations ===
Non-RTO transmission organizations include Columbia Grid and Northern Tier Transmission Group.

ColumbiaGrid, a nonprofit corporation, is not a regional transmission organization (RTO) and has no plans to become one, but instead seeks to achieve many of the benefits of an RTO through incremental additions to its functions. ColumbiaGrid was formed after some of its members chose not to continue in efforts to form Grid West, a Northwest evolutionary structure with the ability to add functions and to move toward independent grid management. The ColumbiaGrid members, including the Bonneville Power Administration, several Washington State public utilities and two investor-owned utilities, wanted an organization with more limited functions and no independent ability to change. ColumbiaGrid performs single-utility transmission planning and expansion via an open and transparent process and is also establishing a multi-system OASIS portal.

The former Grid West participants who had argued for an eventual RTO, mainly investor-owned utilities and state representatives from Oregon, Idaho, Montana, Wyoming and Utah, formed the Northern Tier Transmission Group (NTTG), a nascent effort open to evolution but initially focused on inexpensive and relatively easy improvements to grid management, including area control error (ACE) diversity interchange, currently underway; transparent methodologies for calculating available transmission capacity; and planning, as required by FERC Order 890.

== See also ==
- North American power transmission grid
- Energy policy of the United States

International:

- Transmission system operator (TSO)
- European Network of Transmission System Operators for Electricity

General:

- Energy law
- Electricity distribution
