= Gas Technology Institute =

American non-profit research and development organization

Coordinates: 42.01995°N 87.92241°W

The Gas Technology Institute (GTI) is an American non-profit research and development organization which develops, demonstrates, and licenses new energy technologies for private and public clients, with a particular focus on the natural gas industry. GTI is located in Des Plaines, Illinois.

== History ==
The Gas Technology Institute has its origins in several different organizations.

The Institute of Gas Technology was founded in 1941 at the Illinois Institute of Technology (IIT).

The Gas Research Institute was founded in 1976 by an ad hoc committee made up of members from the American Gas Association and the Interstate Natural Gas Association of America. Encouragement for the gas industry to increase R&D came from the Federal Power Commission in that year.

GRI incorporated as an independent non-profit in Illinois on July 8, 1976.

The Institute sponsored research with funding derived from a surcharge on shipments of natural gas sold by the interstate pipelines, thus passing along R&D costs to gas consumers.

Starting in 1998, the Department of Energy began to steadily reduce E&P (exploration & production) and R&D (research and development) financial support.

By 2000, the funding mechanism that supported the Gas Research Institute was phased out. That year, the Institute of Gas Technology and the Gas Research Institute combined to form the Gas Technology Institute.

In 2006, the IIT building that formerly housed the institute became home to Shimer College, which took up residence there after moving from Waukegan.
