= Transmission service request =

In the electric power industry, a transmission service request is an application requesting a transmission-owning utility to allocate physical capacity in the form of transmission service rights (TSRs) for the transmission of electric power. Every TSR includes at least three components: 1) a point of delivery (POD), where the power is injected into the utility's transmission network; 2) a point of receipt (POR), where the power is withdrawn from the utility's transmission network; 3) the amount of power, or capacity, in megawatts to be reserved. In order to receive TSR, a transmission customer (TC) must complete a transmission service request and go through a system impact study to determine if the existing transmission facilities can reliably accommodate the physical transfer of the electric power. If the capacity is not available, the transmission customer may decide to pay to upgrade the transmission network.

== Background ==
Open access to transmission facilities arose from the Federal Energy Regulatory Commission (FERC) Order 888, issued April 24, 1996. This order required each utility which transmitted electric energy in interstate commerce to file an Open Access Transmission Tariff (OATT) to stipulate the process for non-discriminatory access to its transmission facilities. This access includes generation interconnection and transmission service. Generation interconnection allows for a power generator to connect to the transmission system while transmission service allows for the delivery of electricity through the transmission system. The goal of open access to electric power transmission facilities is to reduce electricity prices by promoting wholesale competition. In exchange for transmission service, transmitting utilities are allowed to charge the customer costs associated with the access to their transmission network. The cost for TSR is determined by a formula contained in the OATT and is often in the units of dollars per megawatt per year. TSRs are often renewed on an annual basis.

== Uses of transmission service rights ==
Transmission service rights can be used for multiple purposes. Often, the TSR is used to facilitate two parties to arrange a power purchase agreement by transferring power from a generator to a load through the utility's transmission facilities. A few of the many potential scenarios where TSRs would be necessary:

1. Commercial and Industrial (C&I) load desires to purchase power from a generator using a utility's transmission network.
2. C&I load is connected to one utility but desires to purchase bulk electric power from another utility.
3. A generator is connected to one utility but desires to sell power to another utility.
4. Two utilities desire to transfer power through another utility's network.

TSR is often pursued when it is either the lowest cost option or is necessary to meet a renewable portfolio standard.
