= California Independent System Operator =

Non-profit Independent System Operator serving California

CAISO
- Type: Non-profit
- Industry: Electricity
- Founded: 1997
- Headquarters: Folsom, California, United States
- Area served: California
- Key people: Elliot Mainzer (President and CEO), Roger Collanton, Stacey Crowley, Neil Millar, Mark Rothleder, Ryan Seghesio, Dede Subakti Joanne Serina, Anna McKenna and Jodi Ziemathis
- Products: Electricity grid management
- Website: www.caiso.com

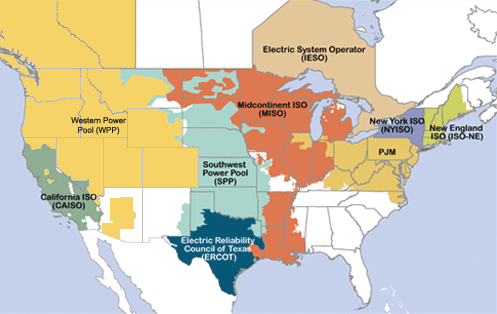
ISOs and RTOs of North America as of 2024

The California Independent System Operator (CAISO) is a non-profit Independent System Operator (ISO) serving California. It oversees the operation of California's bulk electric power system, transmission lines, and electricity market generated and transmitted by its member utilities. CAISO is one of the largest ISOs in the world, delivering 300 million megawatt-hours of electricity each year and managing about 80% of California's electric flow.

== History ==
The California Legislature created CAISO in 1998 as part of the state restructuring of electricity markets. The legislature was responding to Federal Energy Regulatory Commission (FERC) recommendations following the passage of the federal Energy Policy Act of 1992, which removed barriers to competition in the wholesale generation of electricity business. FERC regulates CAISO because interstate transmission lines fall under the jurisdiction of federal commerce laws.

== Management ==
CAISO's leadership consists of executive management and governing board members appointed by the Governor of California.

The current executive leaders are:

- President and CEO: Elliot Mainzer
- Vice Presidents: Roger Collanton, Stacey Crowley, Neil Millar, Petar Ristanovic, Mark Rothleder, Ryan Seghesio, Eric Schmitt, and Jodi Ziemathis

== Renewables ==
In 2018, California ranked first in the nation as a producer of electricity from solar, geothermal, and biomass resources and fourth in the nation in conventional hydroelectric power generation. As of 2017, over half of the electricity (52.7%) produced was from renewable sources. CAISO provides a daily report on California renewable electricity generation, compared to overall system demand.

== Blackouts ==
CAISO settled with the Federal Energy Regulatory Commission and the North American Electric Reliability Corporation for $6 million for violations of standards related to the 2011 Southwest blackout.

Starting August 5, 2020, CAISO ordered the utilities operating on its power grid to cut off power to 200,000–250,000 customers. While CAISO stated the high temperatures and corresponding high demand for air conditioning necessitated rolling blackouts, it enacted the blackouts with significant power reserves still being available. When causing the rolling blackouts, CAISO acted contrary to its own policy, with its 2019 resource assessment calling for stage 3 emergency only with 3% or less available power resources. When stage 3 was first enacted on August 15, the CAISO power grid had 8.9% available resources, about three times the required threshold.

On September 6, 2022, during one of the longest and hottest September heatwaves on record, which encompassed multiple Western states, California's peak electricity demand of 52,061 megawatts occurred. Widespread rolling blackouts were narrowly avoided due to conservation efforts, though several thousand customers in Palo Alto and Alameda had their power cut when CAISO told those cities' municipal power companies to shed load. The CEO of CAISO stated that the 3,300 megawatts of grid storage batteries added since the August 2020 rolling blackouts were definitely helpful during this event.

== See also ==
- Energy in California
- Energy law
- List of United States electric companies
- Deregulation of the Texas electricity market
