= Major Land Resource Areas =

In United States conservation policy, Major Land Resource Areas (MLRA) are geographically associated land resource units delineated by the Natural Resources Conservation Service and characterized by a particular pattern that combines soils, water, climate, vegetation, land use, and type of farming. There are 204 MLRAs in the United States, ranging in size from less than 500,000 acres (202,343 ha) to more than 60 million acres (240,000 km^{2}).
