= Watt+Volt =

Greek utility service company

WATT+VOLT
- Industry: Electricity provider
- Founded: 2011 in Athens, Greece
- Headquarters: Athens, Greece
- Area served: Greece
- Key people: Anastasios Papanagiotou (CEO)
- Services: Integrated electricity services

WATT+VOLT is a utility service company that provides electricity, natural gas, and integrated energy services. The company is based in Athens, Greece.

== History ==
=== 2011 ===
- Establishment of WATT AND VOLT S.A.
- Granting of License for Electricity Supply and Trading

=== 2012 ===
- Installation of "smart" meters for the monitoring of energy consumption in real time, within the "New Innovative Entrepreneurship" framework of the NSRF
- Development of the online WATT + VOLT "Partners" platform for the registration of partners’ applications for electricity supply

=== 2013 ===
- Commencement of Electricity Trading Activity

=== 2014 ===
- Launch of MyWatt application, for the electronic management of the electricity bill by the customer
- Establishment of the subsidiary in Bulgaria, WATT + VOLT Bulgaria EOOD
- Granting of Electricity Supply and Trading License to WATT + VOLT Bulgaria EOOD

=== 2015 ===
- Launch of MyWatt mobile application for iOS and Android devices
- Establishment of ESC (Energy Services Company)
- Establishment of the subsidiary company in Serbia, WATT AND VOLT DOO Beograd
- Granting of Electricity Supply and Trading License to WATT AND VOLT DOO Beograd
- Granting of Natural Gas Supply License to WATT AND VOLT S.A.

=== 2016 ===
- Registration and activation of WATT AND VOLT S.A. in the European Energy Exchange (EEX) - the 1st Greek Private Company participating in it
- Participation in the European Project encompass
- Participation in the European Program HORIZON 2020 inteGRIDy
- Recognition of WATT + VOLT by the London Stock Exchange as one of the 1000 companies that inspire Europe

=== 2017 ===
- Opening of WATT + VOLT stores nationwide

=== 2018 ===
- Commencement of Natural Gas Supply activity
- Launch of the electronic sending of bills service (e-bill)
- Installation of the first charging stations for electric vehicles
- Development of the WATT + VOLT e-learning platform
- Operation of 15 stores throughout Greece
- Upgrade of MyWatt web application and addition of new features

=== 2019 ===
- Participation in the European HEAT4COOL Program
- Establishment of the Group's subsidiary, WATT + VOLT Skopje
- Registration and commencement of the Company's activity in the Hungarian Energy Exchange Market HUPX Hungarian Power Exchange
- Exceeding the limit of 100,000 supply customers (March)
- Commencement of trading of emission allowances, EUA, in the European Energy Exchange
- Launch of Net Metering service
- Operation of 35 stores throughout Greece
- "Smart" electronic customer services via call center
- Upgrade of MyWatt mobile application and addition of new features
- Launch of Gas Boiler Installation service

=== 2020 ===
- The European project enCOMPASS is successfully completed and for WATT + VOLT in particular the results of the extroversion are characterized as exceeding expectations (outreach results)
- WATT + VOLT is the coordinator in the European PRECEPT Project
- Participation in the European BRIGHT Project
- Establishment of the group's subsidiary trading company in Albania, WATT + VOLT Albania
- Issuance of operating license by RAE (Regulatory Authority for Energy) for the activity of WATT + VOLT as a RES Aggregator
- Launch of "Chargespot" application for charging electric vehicles
- Operation of 60 stores throughout Greece
- Electronic contracts with digital signature for customer service without physical presence
- Addition of gas supply management section via MyWatt (mobile and web application)
- Launch of Gas Boiler and Heat Pump Maintenance services
- Menoumespiti action to provide a discount to WATT + VOLT customers during the lockdown period – support to the "Shedia" organization

=== 2021 ===
- Launch of the e-contract, the first end-to-end service for the conclusion of a contract for the supply of electricity exclusively online
- Update of MyWatt mobile application with the addition of Quick Login for easy and secure access to the app with fingerprint or face ID, and a four-digit PIN

== MyWatt ==
WATT+VOLT created a mobile application, MyWatt, that allows users to track their electricity usage. This application allows individuals to limit or control their electricity expenses, provides usage trends from previous years through graphs, and allows payment.

== Subsidiaries ==
- WATT+VOLT DOO Beograd – 100% subsidiary of WATT+VOLT Group - was established on 12 April 2015 and officially received the license of power trading in Serbia.
- WATT+VOLT Bulgaria EOOD was established in mid-2014 and is now a member of WATT+VOLT.
- WATT+VOLT EMT - In January 2015, WATT+VOLT acquired 50% stake of CE group forming WATT+VOLT EMT, licensed of Trading and Power Supply in Bulgaria.

== See also ==
- Energy in Greece
