= Electricity market =

System for trading electrical energy

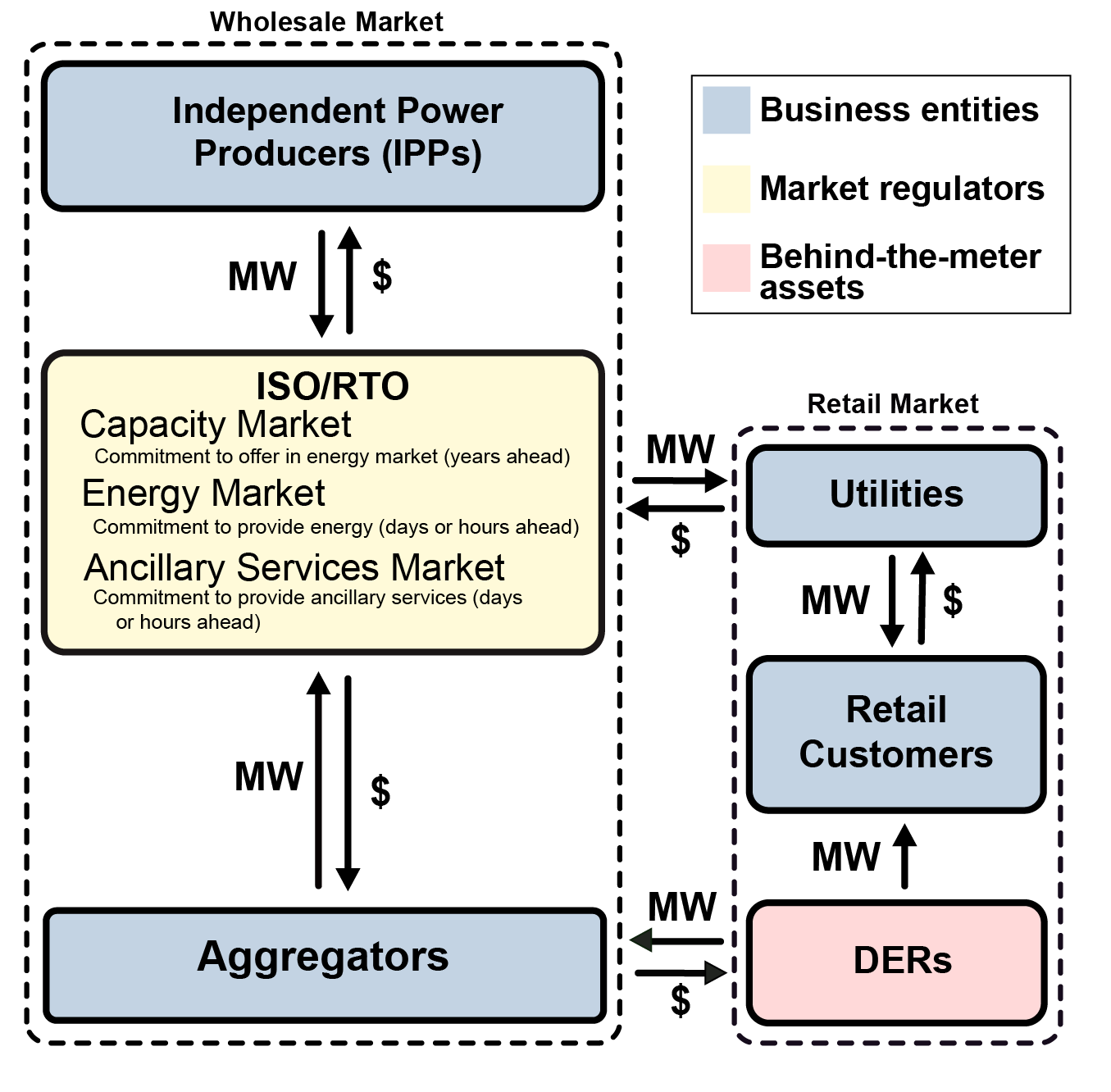
Interaction of wholesale and retail entities in an electricity market (managed by an ISO/RTO)

An electricity market is a system for buying and selling electricity through an electrical grid. Electricity markets facilitate the buying and selling of electricity, although the organization of generation, transmission, distribution, and retailing varies between jurisdictions.

Electricity markets include wholesale markets, in which generators sell electricity to retailers and other purchasers, and, in some jurisdictions, retail markets in which consumers can choose their electricity supplier. Unlike most commodities, electricity must generally be produced and consumed simultaneously, requiring the continuous balancing of supply and demand while maintaining the stability of the electrical grid.

The electric power industry developed in the late 19th and early 20th centuries, initially under a variety of organizational models that later became increasingly regulated. Beginning in the late 20th century, many countries restructured their electricity sectors by introducing competition into electricity generation, wholesale trading, retail supply, or other parts of the industry, while transmission and distribution networks generally remained regulated natural monopolies. More recently, electricity market reforms have increasingly sought to facilitate the integration of variable renewable energy, improve system flexibility, and reduce greenhouse gas emissions.

== History ==
When electric power was first produced and sold to customers, it was not regulated by government. Customers would buy electricity from a producer, who would distribute it through their own network. However, the industry began to be regulated by a variety of government bodies.

=== Traditional industries ===
By the 1950s, a wide variety of arrangements had evolved with substantial differences between countries and even at the regional level, for example:

- France, Italy, the Republic of Ireland and Greece had a nationwide government-owned vertically integrated company;
- The United Kingdom had a government-owned generation and transmission (Central Electricity Generating Board), but the distribution was decentralized in 14 electricity boards;
- Germany combined a small number of regional integrated generation and transmission companies with municipal distribution;
- Japan had 10 regional vertically integrated monopolies;
- Norway's electricity supply was mostly at the level of municipalities;
- In the US, a complex mix of companies, owned either privately or by varying levels of government, evolved, while the regulation favored municipal-level and co-op ownership. For example, Hawaii had only privately owned utilities, Nebraska only publicly owned ones, the Tennessee Valley Authority (the largest generation company) is federally owned, and the Los Angeles Department of Water and Power is city-owned.

These diverse structures had a few unifying features: very little reliance on competitive markets, no formal wholesale markets, and customers unable to choose their suppliers.

The diversity and sheer size of the US market made the potential trade gains large enough to justify some wholesale transactions:

- large utilities were providing electricity to smaller (municipal or cooperative) ones under bilateral requirements contracts;
- coordination sales were made between the vertically integrated companies to reduce the costs, sometimes through power pools.

On the retail side, customers were charged fixed regulated prices that did not change with marginal costs, retail tariffs almost entirely relied on volumetric pricing (based on the meter readings recorded monthly), and fixed cost recovery was included into the per-kWh price.

The traditional market arrangement was designed for the state of the electric industry common pre-restructuring (and still common in some regions, including large parts of the US and Canada). Richard L. Schmalensee calls this state historical (as opposed to post-restructuring emerging one). In the historical regime almost all generation sources can be considered dispatchable (available on demand, unlike the emerging variable renewable energy).

=== Evolution of deregulated markets ===
Chile had become a pioneer in deregulation in the early 1980s (the law of 1982 had codified the changes that were started in 1979). Only few years later the new market approach to electricity was formulated in the US, popularized in the influential work by Joskow and Schmalensee, "Markets for Power: An Analysis of Electrical Utility Deregulation" (1983). At the same time in the UK, Energy Act of 1983 made provisions for common carriage in the electricity networks, enabling a choice of supplier for electricity boards and very large customers (analogous to "wheeling" in the US).

The incorporation of distributed energy resources (DERs) has inspired innovative electricity markets that emerge from a hierarchical deregulated market structure, such as local flexibility markets, with upstream aggregating entities representing multiple DERs (e.g., aggregators). Flexibility Markets refer to the markets in which Distribution System Operators (DSOs) procure services from assets linked to their distribution system, aiming to guarantee the operational safety of the distribution network. This concept is relatively new, and its design is currently a subject of active research. In this sense, different entities can act as aggregators, e.g. demand response aggregators, community managers, electricity service providers, and more, depending on the characteristics of the set of assets being represented.

== Services ==
The structure of an electricity market is quite complex. Markets often include mechanisms to manage a variety of relevant services alongside energy. Services may include:

- on the supply side, a wholesale energy market (all of these use offer caps in some form)
- on the demand side, a retail energy market

A simple "energy-only" wholesale electricity market would only facilitate the sale of energy, without regard for other services that may support the system, and experienced problems once implemented alone. To account for this, the electricity market structure typically includes:

- ancillary services not directly related to producing electricity. These would not generate income in the "energy-only" model, but are essential for overall operation of the system (frequency control market, voltage control and reactive power management, inertial response and others)
- capacity market or some other mechanism providing an income stream necessary to build and maintain additional generation units ("reserves") for the worst-case scenario. On a typical day, these units are never called upon (not "dispatched") and thus would not produce revenue in an "energy only" market.
- cost-based market with audited costs replacing producers' bids in places where the local market power is a concern (e.g., in some parts of the US and entire hydropower-rich countries of Latin America). Due to a lack of competition, electricity networks are subject to price regulation in Australia.

The competitive retail electricity markets were able to maintain their simple structure.

In addition, for most major operators, there are markets for transmission rights and electricity derivatives such as electricity futures and options, which are actively traded.

The market externality of greenhouse gas emissions is sometimes dealt with by carbon pricing.

== Economic theory ==
Electricity market is characterized by unique features that are atypical in the markets for commodities or consumption goods.

Although few somewhat similar markets exist (for example, airplane tickets and hotel rooms, like electricity, cannot be stored and the demand for them varies by season), the magnitude of peak pricing (peak price can be 100 times higher than an off-peak one) sets the electricity market apart (the summer price for a beachfront hotel room can be 3–4 times higher than the off-season one), the hotel/airline markets can also use retail price discrimination, unavailable in the wholesale electricity market. The peculiarities of the electricity market make it fundamentally incomplete.

=== Generation ===
Electricity is typically available on demand. In order to achieve this, the supply must match the demand very closely at any time despite the continuous variations of both (so called grid balancing). Frequently, the only safety margins are the ones provided by the kinetic energy of the physically rotating machinery (synchronous generators and turbines). If there is a mismatch between supply and demand the generators absorb extra energy by speeding up or produce more power by slowing down causing the utility frequency (either 50 or 60 hertz) to increase or decrease. However, the frequency cannot deviate too much from the target: many units of the electrical equipment can be destroyed by the out-of-bounds frequency and thus will automatically disconnect from the grid to protect themselves, potentially triggering a blackout.

There are many other physical and economic constraints affecting the electricity network and the market, with some creating non-convexity:

- a typical consumer is not aware of the current system frequency and pays a fixed price for a unit of energy that does not depend on the balance between supply and demand, and thus can suddenly increase or decrease the consumption;
- variable renewable energy sources are intermittent due to the reliance on the weather and can ramp up or down literally from one minute to another;
- the fossil-fuel and nuclear plants have restrictions on the ramping speed: from 5–30 minutes in the gas-fired plants to hours in the coal-fired generation, and even longer for the nuclear ones;
- many fossil-fuel plants cannot be ramped down below 20–60% of the nameplate capacity;
- due to high cost of the start-up, the production cost of electricity might differ from the marginal cost in some time intervals thus forcing the providers to bid above the marginal cost.

=== Networks ===
Electricity networks are natural monopolies, because it is not feasible to build multiple networks competing against one another. In order to address this, many electricity networks are regulated to address the risk of price gouging. The two main types of network price regulation are:

- Cost of service regulation: prices are based on the actual cost of operating the network
- Incentive regulation: prices are capped based on a prior estimate of costs. The difference between the actual and estimated costs deliver a return or loss to the network operator.

The design of transmission network limits the amount of electricity that can be transmitted from one tightly coupled area ("node") to another, so a generator in one node might be unable to service a load in another node (due to "transmission congestion"), potentially creating fragments of the market that have to be served with local generation ("load pockets").

== Wholesale electricity market ==
A wholesale electricity market, also power exchange or PX, (or energy exchange especially if they also trade gas) is a system enabling purchases, through bids to buy; sales, through offers to sell. Bids and offers use supply and demand principles to set the price. Long-term contracts are similar to power purchase agreements and generally considered private bi-lateral transactions between counterparties.

A wholesale electricity market exists when competing generators offer their electricity output to retailers. The retailers then re-price the electricity and take it to market. While wholesale pricing used to be the exclusive domain of large retail suppliers, increasingly markets like New England are beginning to open up to end-users. Large end-users seeking to cut out unnecessary overhead in their energy costs are beginning to recognize the advantages inherent in such a purchasing move. Consumers buying electricity directly from generators is a relatively recent phenomenon.

Buying wholesale electricity is not without its drawbacks (market uncertainty, membership costs, set up fees, collateral investment, and organization costs, as electricity would need to be bought on a daily basis), however, the larger the end user's electrical load, the greater the benefit and incentive to make the switch.

For an economically efficient electricity wholesale market to flourish it is essential that a number of criteria are met, namely the existence of a coordinated spot market that has "bid-based, security-constrained, economic dispatch with nodal prices". These criteria have been largely adopted in the US, Australia, New Zealand and Singapore.

Markets for power-related commodities required and managed by (and paid for by) market operators to ensure reliability, are considered ancillary services and include such names as spinning reserve, non-spinning reserve, operating reserves, responsive reserve, regulation up, regulation down, and installed capacity.

=== Market clearing ===
Wholesale transactions (bids and offers) in electricity are typically cleared and settled by the market operator or a special-purpose independent entity charged exclusively with that function. Market operators may or may not clear trades, but often require knowledge of the trade to maintain generation and load balance.

Markets for electricity trade net generation output for a number of intervals usually in increments of 5, 15 and 60 minutes.

Two types of auction can be used to determine which producers are dispatched:

- Double auction: the operator aggregates both the supply bids for each interval (forming a supply curve) and demand bids (demand curve). The clearing price is defined by the intersection of the supply and demand curves for each time interval. One example of this is the Nord Pool.
- Single reverse auction: the operator aggregates only the supply bids, and dispatches the cheapest combination of options.

To determine payments, the clearing can use one of two arrangements:

- pay-as-bid (PAB) where each successful bidder is paid the price stated in their bid. This arrangement is not common, but notable cases include the UK and the Nord Pool's intra-day market.
- pay-as-clear: also known as uniform pricing, or marginal pricing system (MPS). All participants are paid the price of the highest successful bid (clearing price). This system is commonly used by the electricity markets.

In PAB, strategic bidding can lead producers to bid much higher than their true cost, because they will be dispatched as long as their bid is below the clearing price.

In the absence of collusion, it is expected that MPS incentivizes producers to bid close to their short run marginal cost to avoid the risk of missing out altogether. MPS is also more transparent, as the new bidder already knows the market price and can estimate the profitability with his marginal cost, to do well with the PAB, the bidder needs information about other bids, too. Due to higher risks of the PAB, it gives an extra advantage to the large players that are better equipped to estimate the market and take the risk (for example, by gambling with a high bid for some of their units). However, MPS results in producers being paid more than their bidding prices by design, leading to calls to replace it with PAB despite the incentive for strategic bidding.

=== Centralized and decentralized markets ===
To handle all the constraints while keeping the system in balance, a central agency, the transmission system operator (TSO), is required to coordinate the unit commitment and economic dispatch. If the frequency falls outside a predetermined range the system operator will act to add or remove either generation or load.

Unlike the real-time decisions that are necessarily centralized, the electricity market itself can be centralized or decentralized. In the centralized market the TSO decides which plant should run and how much is it supposed to produce way before the delivery (during the "spot market" phase, or day-ahead operation). In a decentralized market the producer only commits to the delivery of electricity, but the means to do that are left to the producer itself (for example, it can enter the agreement with another producer to provide the actual energy). Centralized markets make it easier to accommodate non-convexities, while the decentralized allow intra-day trading to correct the possibly suboptimal decisions made day-ahead, for example, accommodating improved weather forecasts for renewables. Due to the difference in the grid construction (US had weaker transmission networks), the design of wholesale markets in the US and Europe had diverged, even though initially the US was followed the European (decentralized) example.

To accommodate the transmission network constraints centralized markets typically use locational marginal pricing (LMP) where each node has its own local market price (thus another name for the practice, nodal pricing). Political considerations sometimes make it unpalatable to force consumers in the same territory, but connected to different nodes, to pay different prices for electricity, so a modified generator nodal pricing (GNP) model is used: the generators are still being paid the nodal prices, while the load serving entities are charging the end users prices that are averaged over the territory. Many decentralized markets do not use the LMP and have a price established over a geographic area ("zone", thus the name zonal pricing) or a "region" (regional pricing, the term is used primarily for very large zones of the National Electricity Market of Australia, where five regions cover the continent).

In the beginning of 2020s there was no clear preference for any of the two market designs, for example, the North American markets went through centralization, while the European ones moved in the opposite direction:

Wholesale markets
	Day-ahead market	Nodal pricing
US markets
PJM	Centralized	Yes
Texas (ERCOT)	Centralized (since 2010)	Yes (GNP)
Midwest ISO (MISO)	Centralized	Yes
California (CAISO)	Centralized	Yes
ISO New England	Centralized	Yes (GNP)
Other markets
Nord Pool	Decentralized	No (zonal)
Great Britain	Decentralized (since 2001)	No
Germany	Decentralized	No (zonal)
Ireland	Decentralized (since 2018)	No (zonal)
Spain	Semi-decentralized	No (zonal)
Italy	Semi-decentralized	No (zonal)
NEM, Australia	Decentralized	No (regional)
New Zealand	Decentralized	Yes
Chile	Cost-based	Yes

=== Centralized market ===
A transmission system operator in a centralized electricity market obtains the cost information (usually three components: start-up costs, no-load costs, marginal production costs) for each unit of generation ("unit-based bidding") and makes all the decisions in the day-ahead and real-time (system redispatch) markets. This approach allows the operator to take into consideration the details of the configuration of the transmission system. The centralized market normally uses the LMP, and the dispatch goal is minimizing the total cost in each node (which in a large network count in hundreds or even thousands). The centralized markets use some procedures resembling the vertically integrated electric utilities of the era before the deregulation, so the centralized markets are also called integrated electricity markets.

Due to the centralized and detailed nature of the day-ahead dispatch, it stays feasible and cost-efficient at the time of delivery, unless some unexpected adverse events occur. Early decisions help to efficiently schedule the plants with the long ramp-up times.

The drawbacks of the centralized design with LMP are:

- politically, it proved hard to justify higher electricity pricing for customers in some locations. In the US the solution was found in the form of GNP;
- simplified bidding does not allow for the proper capture of the cost structure of a more complicated plants, like a combined cycle gas turbine or a hydropower cascade;
- generation companies have an incentive to overstate their start-up costs (to capture more make-whole payments, see below);
- absence of the intra-day market makes integration of the renewables harder;
- the integrated markets are very computation-intensive, this complexity makes them opaque to traders and hard to scale;
- the unchecked power of the transmission system operator makes it harder for the regulator to handle.

Price of a unit of electricity with LMP is based on the marginal cost, so the start-up and no-load costs are not included. Centralized markets therefore typically pay a compensation for these costs to the producer (so called make-whole or uplift payments), financed in some way by the market participants (and, ultimately, the consumers).

Inflexibility of the centralized market manifests itself in two ways:

- once set at the day-ahead market, the contract usually cannot be changed (some markets allow for an hour-ahead correction), so unexpected adverse events have to be accommodated in the real-time and thus in suboptimal way, hurting producers with long ramp-up times, complex cost structures, wind power generation;
- new technology (energy storage, demand response) with new cost structures require time and effort to accommodate.

Market clearing algorithms are complex (some are NP-complete) and have to be executed in limited time (5–60 minutes). The results are thus not necessarily optimal, are hard to replicate independently, and require the market participants to trust the operator (due to the complexity sometimes a decision by the algorithm to accept or reject the bid appears entirely arbitrary to the bidder).

If the transmission system operator owns the actual transmission network, it would be incentivized to profit by increasing the congestion rents. Thus in the US the operator typically does not own any capacity and is frequently called an independent system operator (ISO).

==== Cost-based market ====
The higher degree of centralization of the market involves the direct cost calculations by the market operator (producers no longer submit bids). Despite the obvious problem with generation companies incentivized to inflate their costs (this can be hidden through transactions with affiliated companies), this cost-based electricity market arrangement eliminates the market power of the providers and is used in situation when an abuse of market power is possible (e. g., Chile with its preponderance of hydropower, in the US when the local market power is sufficiently high, some European markets). A less-obvious issue is the tendency of market participants under these conditions to concentrate on investments in the peaker plants to the detriment of the baseload power. One of the advantages of the cost-based market is the relatively low cost to set it up. The cost-based approach is popular in Latin America: in addition to Chile, it is used in Bolivia, Peru, Brazil, and countries in Central America.

A system operator performs an audit of parameters of each generator unit (including heat rate, minimum load, ramping speed, etc.) and estimates the direct marginal costs of its operation. Based on this information, an hour-by-hour dispatch schedule is put in place to minimize the total direct cost. In the process, the hourly shadow prices are obtained for each node that might be used to settle the market sales.

=== Decentralized market ===
Decentralized markets allow the generation companies to choose their own way to provide energy for their day-ahead bid (that specifies price and location). The provider can use any unit at its disposal (so called "portfolio-based bidding") or even pay another company to deliver the energy. The market still has the central operator that exclusively controls the system in real-time, but with significantly diminished powers to intervene ahead of delivery (frequently just the ability to schedule the transmission network for day-ahead operation). This arrangement makes operator's ownership of the transmission capacity less of an issue, and European countries, with the exception of UK, permit it (following the independent transmission system operator or ITSO model).

While some operators in Europe are involved in structuring the day-ahead and intra-day markets, the other ones are not. For example, the UK market after the New Electricity Trading Arrangements in UK and the market in New Zealand let the markets sort out all the frictions before real-time. This reliance on financial instruments leads to the additional names for the decentralized markets: exchange-based, unbundled, bilateral.

=== Bid-based, security-constrained, economic dispatch with nodal prices ===
The system price in the day-ahead market is, in principle, determined by matching offers from generators to bids from consumers at each node to develop a classic supply and demand equilibrium price, usually on an hourly interval, and is calculated separately for subregions in which the system operator's load flow model indicates that constraints will bind transmission imports.

The theoretical prices of electricity at each node on the network is a calculated "shadow price", in which it is assumed that one additional kilowatt-hour is demanded at the node in question, and the hypothetical incremental cost to the system that would result from the optimized redispatch of available units establishes the hypothetical production cost of the hypothetical kilowatt-hour. This is known as locational marginal pricing (LMP) or nodal pricing and is used in some deregulated markets, most notably in the Midcontinent Independent System Operator (MISO), PJM Interconnection, ERCOT, New York, and ISO New England markets in the United States, New Zealand, and in Singapore.

In practice, the LMP algorithm described above is run, incorporating a security-constrained (defined below), least-cost dispatch calculation with supply based on the generators that submitted offers in the day-ahead market, and demand based on bids from load-serving entities draining supplies at the nodes in question.

Due to various non-convexities present in wholesale electricity markets, in the form of economies of scale, start-up and/or shut-down costs, avoidable costs, indivisibilities, minimum supply requirements, etc., some suppliers may incur losses under LMP, e.g., because they may fail to recover their fixed cost through commodity payments only. To address this problem, various pricing schemes that lift the price above marginal cost and/or provide side-payments (uplifts) have been proposed. Liberopoulos and Andrianesis (2016) review and compare several of these schemes on the price, uplifts, and profits that each scheme generates.

While in theory the LMP concepts are useful and not evidently subject to manipulation, in practice system operators have substantial discretion over LMP results through the ability to classify units as running in "out-of-merit dispatch", which are thereby excluded from the LMP calculation. In most systems, units that are dispatched to provide reactive power to support transmission grids are declared to be "out-of-merit" (even though these are typically the same units that are located in constrained areas and would otherwise result in scarcity signals). System operators also normally bring units online to hold as "spinning-reserve" to protect against sudden outages or unexpectedly rapid ramps in demand, and declare them "out-of-merit". The result is often a substantial reduction in clearing price at a time when increasing demand would otherwise result in escalating prices.

Researchers have noted that a variety of factors, including energy price caps set well below the putative scarcity value of energy, the effect of "out-of-merit" dispatch, the use of techniques such as voltage reductions during scarcity periods with no corresponding scarcity price signal, etc., results in a missing money problem. The consequence is that prices paid to suppliers in the "market" are substantially below the levels required to stimulate new entry. The markets have therefore been useful in bringing efficiencies to short-term system operations and dispatch, but have been a failure in what was advertised as a principal benefit: stimulating suitable new investment where it is needed, when it is needed.

In LMP markets, where constraints exist on a transmission network, there is a need for more expensive generation to be dispatched on the downstream side of the constraint. Prices on either side of the constraint separate giving rise to congestion pricing and constraint rentals.

A constraint can be caused when a particular branch of a network reaches its thermal limit or when a potential overload will occur due to a contingent event (e.g., failure of a generator or transformer or a line outage) on another part of the network. The latter is referred to as a security constraint. Transmission systems are operated to allow for continuity of supply even if a contingent event, like the loss of a line, were to occur. This is known as a security constrained system.

In most systems the algorithm used is a "DC" model rather than an "AC" model, so constraints and redispatch resulting from thermal limits are identified/predicted, but constraints and redispatch resulting from reactive power deficiencies are not. Some systems take marginal losses into account. The prices in the real-time market are determined by the LMP algorithm described above, balancing supply from available units. This process is carried out for each 5-minute, half-hour or hour (depending on the market) interval at each node on the transmission grid. The hypothetical redispatch calculation that determines the LMP must respect security constraints and the redispatch calculation must leave sufficient margin to maintain system stability in the event of an unplanned outage anywhere on the system. This results in a spot market with "bid-based, security-constrained, economic dispatch with nodal prices".

Many established markets do not employ nodal pricing, examples being the UK, EPEX SPOT (most European countries), and Nord Pool Spot (Nordic and Baltic countries).

=== Risk management ===
Financial risk management is often a high priority for participants in deregulated electricity markets due to the substantial price and volume risks that the markets can exhibit. A consequence of the complexity of a wholesale electricity market can be extremely high price volatility at times of peak demand and supply shortages. The particular characteristics of this price risk are highly dependent on the physical fundamentals of the market such as the mix of types of generation plant and relationship between demand and weather patterns. Price risk can be manifest by price "spikes" which are hard to predict and price "steps" when the underlying fuel or plant position changes for long periods.

Volume risk is often used to denote the phenomenon whereby electricity market participants have uncertain volumes or quantities of consumption or production. For example, a retailer is unable to accurately predict consumer demand for any particular hour more than a few days into the future and a producer is unable to predict the precise time that they will have plant outage or shortages of fuel. A compounding factor is also the common correlation between extreme price and volume events. For example, price spikes frequently occur when some producers have plant outages or when some consumers are in a period of peak consumption. The introduction of substantial amounts of intermittent power sources such as wind energy may affect market prices.

Electricity retailers, who in aggregate buy from the wholesale market, and generators who in aggregate sell to the wholesale market, are exposed to these price and volume effects and to protect themselves from volatility, they will enter into "hedge contracts" with each other. The structure of these contracts varies by regional market due to different conventions and market structures. However, the two simplest and most common forms are simple fixed price forward contracts for physical delivery and contracts for differences where the parties agree a strike price for defined time periods. In the case of a contract for difference, if a resulting wholesale price index (as referenced in the contract) in any time period is higher than the "strike" price, the generator will refund the difference between the "strike" price and the actual price for that period. Similarly a retailer will refund the difference to the generator when the actual price is less than the "strike price". The actual price index is sometimes referred to as the "spot" or "pool" price, depending on the market.

Many other hedging arrangements, such as swing contracts, virtual bidding, financial transmission rights, call options and put options are traded in sophisticated electricity markets. In general they are designed to transfer financial risks between participants.

=== Price capping and cross subsidy ===
Due to high gas prices because of the 2022 Russia–European Union gas dispute, in late 2022 the EU capped non-gas power prices at 180 euros per megawatt hour and the UK is considering price capping. Fossil fuels, especially gas, may be price capped higher than renewables, with revenue above the cap subsidizing some consumers, as in Turkey. Academic study of an earlier price cap in that market concluded that it reduced welfare, and another study said that an EU-wide price cap would risk "a never-ending spiral of higher import prices and higher subsidies". It has been academically argued via game theory that a cap on the price of imported Russian gas (some of which is used to generate electricity) could be beneficial, however politically this is difficult.

=== Wholesale electricity markets ===
- Argentina – see Electricity sector in Argentina
- Australia – see Electricity sector in Australia
  - Wholesale Electricity Market (WA) – Australian Energy Market Operator (AEMO)
  - National Electricity Market (East Coast) – AEMO
- Austria – see EPEX SPOT and EXAA Energy Exchange
- Belgium – see APX Group
- Brazil – see Electricity sector in Brazil
- Canada – see Electricity sector in Canada
- Chile – see Electricity sector in Chile
- Colombia – see Electricity sector in Colombia
- Czech Republic – Czech electricity and gas market operator and Power Exchange Central Europe (PXE)
- Croatia – Croatian Power Exchange (CROPEX)
- France – see Electricity sector in France and EPEX SPOT
- Germany – see Electricity sector in Germany, European Energy Exchange AG (EEX) and EPEX SPOT
- Hungary – Hungarian Power Exchange HUPX and Power Exchange Central Europe (PXE)
- India – see Indian Energy Exchange and Power Exchange India Limited (PXIL)
- Ireland – Single Electricity Market Operator (SEMO)
- Italy – GME
- Japan – see Electricity sector in Japan and Japan Electric Power Exchange (JEPX)
- Korea – Korea Power Exchange (KPX)
- Mexico – Centro Nacional de Control de Energía (CENACE)
- Netherlands – see APX-ENDEX
- New Zealand – see Electricity sector in New Zealand and New Zealand Electricity Market
- Philippines – Philippine Wholesale Electricity Spot Market
- Poland – Polish Power Exchange (POLPX)
- Portugal – OMI-Polo Español, S.A. (OMIE), OMIP, Sociedad Rectora del Mercado de Productos Derivados, S.A. (MEFF), and European Energy Exchange AG (EEX)
- Scandinavia – see Nord Pool Spot
- Slovakia – Power Exchange Central Europe (PXE)
- Spain – OMI-Polo Español, S.A. (OMIE), OMIP, Sociedad Rectora del Mercado de Productos Derivados, S.A. (MEFF), and EEX
- Sultanate of Oman – Oman Electricity Market
- Russian Federation – Trade System Administrator (ATS)
- Singapore – Energy Market Authority of Singapore (EMA) and Energy Market Company (EMC)
- Turkey – see Electricity sector in Turkey, Turkish Electricity Market
- United Kingdom – see APX-ENDEX and Elexon
- United States – summarized by the Federal Energy Regulatory Commission (FERC).
  - California Independent System Operator
  - ERCOT Market in Texas
  - Midwest – Midcontinent Independent System Operator (MISO Energy)
  - New England market
  - New York – New York Independent System Operator (NYISO)
  - PJM Interconnection for all or parts of Delaware, Illinois, Indiana, Kentucky, Maryland, Michigan, New Jersey, North Carolina, Ohio, Pennsylvania, Tennessee, Virginia, West Virginia, and the District of Columbia.
  - Southwest – Southwest Power Pool, Inc
- Vietnam – Vietnam wholesale electricity market (VWEM). Operated by EVN

==== Electric power exchanges ====
An electric power exchange is a commodities exchange dealing with electric power:

- Indian Energy Exchange
- APX Group
- Energy Exchange Austria
- European Energy Exchange
- European Power Exchange
- HUPX Hungarian Power Exchange
- Nord Pool AS
- Powernext

=== International trading ===
Electricity itself, or products made with a lot of electricity, exported to another country may be charged a carbon tariff if the exporting country has no carbon price: for example as the UK has the UK ETS it would not be charged the EU Carbon Border Adjustment Mechanism whereas Turkey has no carbon price so might be charged.

=== Possible future changes ===
Rather than the traditional merit order based on cost, when there is excess generation ramping down the plants which most damage health has been suggested. Due to the growth of renewables and the 2021–2022 global energy crisis some countries are considering changing their electricity markets. For example, some Europeans suggest decoupling electricity prices from natural gas prices.

== Retail electricity market ==
A retail electricity market exists when end-use customers can choose their supplier from competing electricity retailers; one term used in the United States for this type of consumer choice is 'energy choice'. A separate issue for electricity markets is whether or not consumers face real-time pricing (prices based on the variable wholesale price) or a price that is set in some other way, such as average annual costs. In many markets, consumers do not pay based on the real-time price, and hence have no incentive to reduce demand at times of high (wholesale) prices or to shift their demand to other periods. Demand response may use pricing mechanisms or technical solutions to reduce peak demand.

Generally, electricity retail reform follows from electricity wholesale reform. However, it is possible to have a single electricity generation company and still have retail competition. If a wholesale price can be established at a node on the transmission grid and the electricity quantities at that node can be reconciled, competition for retail customers within the distribution system beyond the node is possible. In the German market, for example, large, vertically integrated utilities compete with one another for customers on a more or less open grid.

Although market structures vary, there are some common functions that an electricity retailer has to be able to perform, or enter into a contract for, to compete effectively. Failure or incompetence in the execution of one or more of the following has led to some dramatic financial disasters:

- Billing
- Credit control
- Customer management via an efficient call centre
- Distribution use-of-system contract
- Reconciliation agreement
- "Pool" or "spot market" purchase agreement
- Hedge contracts – contracts for differences to manage "spot price" risk

The two main areas of weakness have been risk management and billing. In the United States in 2001, California's flawed regulation of retail competition led to the California electricity crisis and left incumbent retailers subject to high spot prices but without the ability to hedge against these. In the UK a retailer, Independent Energy, with a large customer base went bust when it could not collect the money due from customers.

Competitive retail needs open access to distribution and transmission wires. This in turn requires that prices must be set for both these services. They must also provide appropriate returns to the owners of the wires and encourage efficient location of power plants. There are two types of fees, the access fee and the regular fee. The access fee covers the cost of having and accessing the network of wires available, or the right to use the existing transmission and distribution network. The regular fee reflects the marginal cost of transferring electricity through the existing network of wires.

New technology is available and has been piloted by the US Department of Energy that may be better suited to real-time market pricing. A potential use of event-driven SOA (service-oriented architecture) could be a virtual electricity market where home clothes dryers can bid on the price of the electricity they use in a real-time market pricing system. The real-time market price and control system could turn home electricity customers into active participants in managing the power grid and their monthly utility bills. Customers can set limits on how much they would pay for electricity to run a clothes dryer, for example, and electricity providers willing to transmit power at that price would be alerted over the grid and could sell the electricity to the dryer.

On one side, consumer devices can bid for power based on how much the owner of the device were willing to pay, set ahead of time by the consumer. On the other side, suppliers can enter bids automatically from their electricity generators, based on how much it would cost to start up and run the generators. Further, the electricity suppliers could perform real-time market analysis to determine return-on-investment for optimizing profitability or reducing end-user cost of goods. The effects of a competitive retail electricity market are mixed across states, but generally appear to lower prices in states with high participation and raise prices in states that have little customer participation.

Event-driven SOA software could allow homeowners to customize many different types of electricity devices found within their home to a desired level of comfort or economy. The event-driven software could also automatically respond to changing electricity prices, in as little as five-minute intervals. For example, to reduce the home owner's electricity usage in peak periods (when electricity is most expensive), the software could automatically lower the target temperature of the thermostat on the central heating system (in winter) or raise the target temperature of the thermostat on the central cooling system (in summer).

== Deregulated market experience ==
Comparisons between the traditional and competitive market designs experience have provide mixed results. The US experience where the deregulated utilities operate alongside the vertically integrated ones, there is some evidence of the increased efficiencies:

- deregulated nuclear and coal-fired plants (but not the gas-fired ones) outperformed their vertically integrated peers;
- deregulated plants switched to less capital-intensive strategies of complying with the regulations;
- the wholesale trading allowed for substantially better use of the generation facilities;
- the departures of prices from costs (generation company mark-ups) had increased.

Schmalensee concludes that it is plausible that the restructuring resulted in lower wholesale prices, at least in the US and the UK. MacKay and Mercadal in a large-scale analysis of the US market between 1994 and 2016, while confirming Schmalensee's findings on lower costs, reached the opposite conclusion on the prices: deregulated utilities realized significantly higher prices due to higher markup of the generation facilities and double extraction of the profit margin by the two vertically separated companies.

Regarding resource adequacy, the US market at the start of restructuring had excess generating capacity, confirming the expectation that regulated prices provide an incentive for the generators to overinvest. Initial hope that the revenue stream would be sufficient to continue building up the capacity did not materialize: faced with abuse of market power, all US markets introduced wholesale price caps that in many case were much lower than the value of lost load thus creating the "missing money problem" (capping revenue at the time of relatively infrequent shortages causes the shortage of money to build the infrastructure that is only used during these shortages); the problem of over-investment was replaced by underinvestment, dragging down the grid reliability. In response, major transfer payments for capacity were instituted (in the US in 2018 the payments were getting as high as 47% of the new unit's revenue). EU markets followed the American lead in the 2010s. Schmalensee notes that while the process of determining the amount of compensation for new capacity in the US is in principle similar to the integrated resource planning of the traditional markets, the new version is less transparent and provides less certainty due to frequent rule changes (the traditional scheme guaranteed the cost recovery), so an efficiency improvement in this area is unlikely.

The introduction of the choice of supplier and variable pricing in the retail market was enthusiastically supported by larger consumers (businesses) that can employ the time of consumption-shifting techniques to benefit from the time-of-use pricing and have access to hedging against very high prices. Acceptance among residential customers in the US was minimal.

Many regional markets have achieved some success, and the ongoing trend continues to be towards deregulation and introduction of competition. However, in 2000/2001 major failures such as the California electricity crisis and the Enron debacle caused a slow down in the pace of change and in some regions an increase in market regulation and reduction in competition. However, this trend is widely regarded as a temporary one against the longer-term trend towards more open and competitive markets.

Notwithstanding the favorable light in which market solutions are viewed conceptually, the "missing money" problem has to date proved intractable. If electricity prices were to move to the levels needed to incentivize new merchant (i.e., market-based) transmission and generation, the costs to consumers would be politically difficult.

The increase in annual costs to consumers in New England alone were calculated at $3 billion during the recent FERC hearings on the NEPOOL market structure. Several mechanisms that are intended to incentivize new investment where it is most needed by offering enhanced capacity payments (but only in zones where generation is projected to be short) have been proposed for NEPOOL, PJM and NYPOOL, and go under the generic heading of "locational capacity" or LICAP (the PJM version is called the "Reliability Pricing Model", or "RPM").

== Capacity market ==
In a deregulated grid some sort of incentives are necessary for market participants to build and maintain generation and transmission resources that may some day be called upon to maintain the grid balance (supporting the "resource adequacy", or RA), but most of the time these resources are idled and do not produce revenue from the sale of electricity. Since "energy-only markets have the potential to result in an equilibrium point for the market that is not consistent with what users and regulators want to see", all existing wholesale electricity markets rely on offer caps in some form. These caps prevent the suppliers from fully recovering their investment into the reserve capacity through the scarcity pricing, creating a missing money problem for generators. To avoid underinvestment into the generation and transmission capacity, all markets employ some kind of RA transfers.

Typical regulator requires a retailer to purchase firm capacity for 110–120% of its annual peak power. The contracts are either bilateral (between the retailers and generator owners), or are traded on a centralized capacity market (the case, e.g., for the eastern USA grid).

=== Turkey ===
The capacity mechanism is claimed to be a mechanism for subsiding coal in Turkey, and has been criticised by some economists, as they say it encourages strategic capacity withholding. It was designed to keep gas plants in the system. Unlike many other markets it is a hybrid system based partly on fixed costs and partly on market clearing price. Many say it is not good and should be changed, for example by using regional bidding zones because constraint management is the main problem in the market.

=== United Kingdom ===
The Capacity Market is a part of the British government's Electricity Market Reform package. According to the Department for Business, Energy and Industrial Strategy "the Capacity Market will ensure security of electricity supply by providing a payment for reliable sources of capacity, alongside their electricity revenues, to ensure they deliver energy when needed. This will encourage the investment we need to replace older power stations and provide backup for more intermittent and inflexible low carbon generation sources".

==== Auctions ====
Two Capacity Market Auctions are held each year. The T-4 auction buys capacity to be delivered in four years' time and the T-1 auction is a top-up auction held just ahead of each delivery year. Capacity Market Auction results have been published for several years.

- 2023, 7.6 GW for delivery in 2024/25, mostly gas and nuclear
- 2023, 42.8 GW for delivery in 2027/28, mostly gas

==== Definitions ====
The National Grid 'Guidance document for Capacity Market participants' provides the following definitions:

- "CMU (Capacity Market Unit) – this is the Generating Unit(s) or DSR Capacity that is being prequalified and will ultimately provide Capacity should they secure a Capacity Agreement".
- "A Generating CMU is a generating unit that provides electricity, is capable of being controlled independently from any other generating unit outside the CMU, is measured by 1 or more half hourly meters and has a connection capacity greater than 2MW".
- "A DSR CMU is a commitment by a person to provide an amount of capacity by a method of Demand Side Response by either reducing the DSR customers import of electricity, as measured by one or more half hourly meters, exporting electricity generated by one or more permitted on site generating units or varying demand for active power in response to changing system frequency".

=== United States ===
In the United States, regulators and regional transmission organizations have differing policies on whether there should be a capacity market at all, and how it should be structured.

==== New England ====
In 2008, three years after officially becoming a regional transmission organization, ISO New England held its first Forward Capacity Auction. In this design, a capacity auction was held three years prior to the "capacity commitment period", the year (reckoned from June 1 to May 31) in which the generator or demand-response resource was required to be available for dispatching. Prior to the auction, the ISO would determine the amount of capacity to be procured (the "installed capacity requirement"), and resources would have the opportunity to enter the market (if new) or leave it. The capacity auction follows a "descending clock" model: the price starts high and is reduced in successive rounds until a price is found below which insufficient resources are willing to sell to meet the requirement. All resources that clear in the auction are paid the same rate for their capacity. There were three annual reconfiguration auctions prior to the capacity commitment period, allowing resources to adjust their capacity offers for changing circumstances, and monthly reconfiguration auctions two months prior to delivery. Resources that received a capacity supply obligation were required to offer energy in the energy markets in amounts greater than or equal to their obligation, if physically possible, and could be fined for being unable to supply the committed capacity.

Starting in late 2022, ISO New England began studying alternative capacity market structures, considering changes to both the timing of capacity auctions and the way resources offering into the market would be accredited (i.e., how the ISO would determine how much capacity each resource was allowed to offer). One major consideration was whether to have a seasonal market, reflecting the facts that some resources have weather-dependent capacity and that the peak demand on the power system is different in summer and winter months. Another concern was preventing "phantom" resources — that is, generators that are planned to be built but have not demonstrated commercial operation — from influencing the capacity market, which in the old forward capacity market design required financial assurances from new resources.

In November, 2023, the ISO filed with the Federal Energy Regulatory Commission (FERC) to delay the 19th forward capacity auction, which was to be held in February, 2025, for the commitment period from June, 2028, through May, 2029, In 2024, after considering advice from independent consultants, the ISO filed again to delay the auction by two years, until 2027, with the intent of having the new auction design approved before then, in time for the 2028–29 capacity auction to be conducted under new rules. FERC granted the delay on May 20, 2024.

In late 2025, ISO New England filed its first set of tariff changes for the reformed capacity market, shifting the auction to take place immediately before the commitment period and changing how resource retirements are handled, with additional tariff changes expected to be filed later addressing seasonal resource accreditation. The changes leave PJM as the last remaining regional grid operator still using the three-year-ahead ("forward") capacity market structure. FERC accepted these tariff changes on March 30.

The second tariff filing, implementing the seasonality and accreditation reforms, is expected to take place in the fourth quarter of calendar year 2026. The last forward capacity auction held under the old rules, for the June 1, 2027, to May 31, 2028 commitment period, took place on February 5, 2024, and procured 31,556 megawatts of capacity at a final clearing price of $3.58 per kilowatt-month.

== Examples ==
=== Typical US wholesale market design ===
In the United States, seven Independent System Operators (ISOs) and Regional Transmission Organizations (RTOs) manage the transmission grid and facilitate wholesale electricity trading for over 60% of the country's power supply. These centrally-managed wholesale markets typically operate using a two-settlement system, consisting of a Day-Ahead Market (DAM) and a Real-Time Market (RTM), to coordinate the commitment and dispatch of generation resources. The primary participants in these wholesale markets are

- Generation companies (GenCos) that own and operate the transmission-connected generation resources that supply power to the grid. GenCos participate by submitting supply offers to the ISO, which characterize their operational limits and costs, including start-up costs, no-load costs, and variable energy costs.
- Load-Serving Entities that purchase bulk power from the wholesale market to service downstream retail customers. LSEs participate by submitting demand bids that specify the quantity of power they intend to consume at specific locations and price levels.

==== Day-ahead market (DAM) ====
The day-ahead market allows market participants to secure prices and schedules for energy one day prior to the operating day. LSEs submit their demand bids and GenCos submit their supply offers for the upcoming operating day. The ISO solves a Security-Constrained Unit Commitment (SCUC) problem to determine the optimal "on/off" status of generating units and the dispatch levels that minimize total system costs while satisfying transmission constraints. The DAM produces hourly day-ahead Locational Marginal Prices (LMPs), which reflect the marginal cost of supplying the next unit of energy at a specific location.

==== Reliability and residual unit commitment ====
Following the close of the day-ahead market, ISOs typically perform a Residual Unit Commitment (RUC) or reliability check process. While the DAM clears based on financial bids and offers, the RUC process ensures that the system has sufficient physical capacity committed to meet the ISO's own centralized load forecast, which may differ from the bid-in demand cleared in the DAM. If the DAM schedule is insufficient to meet the reliability forecast, the ISO commits additional resources during this stage to ensure grid reliability.

==== Real-time market ====
The real-time market (RTM) balances supply and demand during the actual operating day, accounting for deviations from the day-ahead schedule and unforeseen system conditions (e.g., generator outages or load fluctuations). The ISO runs a security-constrained economic dispatch (SCED) algorithm, typically every 5 to 15 minutes, to determine the real-time dispatch instructions for generators. Financial settlement is based on deviations. Participants pay or are paid the real-time LMP for any quantity of energy consumed or produced that differs from their day-ahead schedule.

==== Ancillary Services ====
In addition to energy, ISOs manage markets for ancillary services to maintain system frequency and stability. These services, such as regulation and operating reserves, are often co-optimized with energy in both the day-ahead and real-time markets to ensure the most efficient use of generation capacity.

== See also ==
- Availability-based tariff
- Central Electricity Generating Board (CEGB)
- Competition law
- Cost of electricity by source
- Distributed generation
- Local flexibility markets
- Energy demand management
- Future energy development
- Independent system operator
- Load profile
- Negawatt Power
- NERC Tag
- North American Electric Reliability Corporation
- Open Energy Modelling Initiative
- Power quality
- Power purchase agreement
- Vehicle-to-grid

== Sources ==
- Ahlqvist, Victor; Holmberg, Pär; Tangerås, Thomas (March 2022). "A survey comparing centralized and decentralized electricity markets". Energy Strategy Reviews. 40 100812. Bibcode:2022EneSR..4000812A. doi:10.1016/j.esr.2022.100812. ISSN 2211-467X. S2CID 246215293.
- Tezak, Christine (24 June 2005). Resource Adequacy - Alphabet Soup! (PDF). Stanford Washington Research Group.
- Wolak, Frank A. (July 2021a), Long-Term Resource Adequacy in Wholesale Electricity Markets with Significant Intermittent Renewables (PDF), National Bureau of Economic Research, doi:10.3386/w29033
- Tsaousoglou, Georgios; Giraldo, Juan S.; Paterakis, Nikolaos G. (March 2022). "Market Mechanisms for Local Electricity Markets: A review of models, solution concepts and algorithmic techniques". Renewable and Sustainable Energy Reviews. 156 111890. doi:10.1016/j.rser.2021.111890. ISSN 1364-0321. S2CID 244875062.
- Glachant, Jean-Michel; Joskow, Paul L.; Pollitt, Michael G., eds. (12 November 2021). Handbook on Electricity Markets. Edward Elgar Publishing. ISBN 978-1-78897-995-5. OCLC 1269617034.
  - Glachant, Jean-Michel; Joskow, Paul L.; Pollitt, Michael G. (12 November 2021). "Introduction to the Handbook on Electricity Markets". Handbook on Electricity Markets. Edward Elgar Publishing. doi:10.4337/9781788979955.00006. ISBN 978-1-78897-995-5.
  - Schmalensee, Richard (12 November 2021). "Strengths and weaknesses of traditional arrangements for electricity supply". Handbook on Electricity Markets. Edward Elgar Publishing. doi:10.4337/9781788979955.00008. ISBN 978-1-78897-995-5. S2CID 244796440.
  - Littlechild, Stephen (12 November 2021). "The evolution of competitive retail electricity markets" (PDF). Handbook on Electricity Markets. Edward Elgar Publishing. doi:10.4337/9781788979955.00011. ISBN 978-1-78897-995-5. S2CID 244782657. The page numbering in the cites follows the online source. For the printed book, add about 110 to the page number/
  - Wolak, Frank A. (12 November 2021b). "Wholesale electricity market design". Handbook on Electricity Markets (PDF). Edward Elgar Publishing. doi:10.4337/9781788979955.00010. ISBN 978-1-78897-995-5.
- Munoz, Francisco D.; Wogrin, Sonja; Oren, Shmuel S.; Hobbs, Benjamin F. (2017). "Economic Inefficiencies of Cost-Based Electricity Market Designs" (PDF). SSRN Electronic Journal. doi:10.2139/ssrn.2974353. eISSN 1556-5068. S2CID 157916110.
- Wollmann, Hellmut; Baldersheim, Harald; Citroni, Guilio; Marcou, Gérard; McEldowney, John (1 January 2010). "From public service to commodity: The de-municipalization (and re-municipalization?) of energy provision in Germany, Italy, France, the UK and Norway". In Hellmut Wollmann; Gérard Marcou (eds.). The Provision of Public Services in Europe: Between State, Local Government and Market. Edward Elgar Publishing. ISBN 978-1-84980-722-7. OCLC 1027487606.
- Nielsen, Steffen; Sorknæs, Peter; Østergaard, Poul Alberg (July 2011). "Electricity market auction settings in a future Danish electricity system with a high penetration of renewable energy sources – A comparison of marginal pricing and pay-as-bid". Energy. 36 (7): 4434–4444. Bibcode:2011Ene....36.4434N. doi:10.1016/j.energy.2011.03.079. ISSN 0360-5442.
- Sirin, Selahattin Murat; Camadan, Ercument; Erten, Ibrahim (17 September 2022). "Market Failure or Politics? A Systematic Review of Literature on Price Spikes and a Case Study of the Regulatory Responses to Surging Electricity Prices in European Countries". SSRN 4221661.
- Cramton, Peter (2017). "Electricity market design". Oxford Review of Economic Policy. 33 (4): 589–612. doi:10.1093/oxrep/grx041. eISSN 1460-2121. hdl:1814/59738. ISSN 0266-903X.
- MacKay, Alexander; Mercadal, Ignacia (12 December 2022). Deregulation, Market Power, and Prices: Evidence from the Electricity Sector (PDF). Harvard Business School.
- Aagaard, Todd; Kleit, Andrew N. (2022). "Too Much Is Never Enough: Constructing Electricity Capacity Market Demand" (PDF). Energy Law Journal. 43 (1). Washington: 79–124.
- Joskow, Paul L.; Léautier, Thomas-Olivier (12 November 2021). "Optimal wholesale pricing and investment in generation: the basics" (PDF). Handbook on Electricity Markets. Edward Elgar Publishing. pp. 36–72. doi:10.4337/9781788979955.00009. ISBN 978-1-78897-995-5. S2CID 229936961.
- Li, Wanning; Tesfatsion, Leigh (2018). "A Swing-Contract Market Design for Flexible Service Provision in Electric Power Systems". In Meyn, Sean; Samad, Tariq; Glavaski, Sonja; Hiskens, Ian; Stoustrup, Jakob (eds.). Energy Markets and Responsive Grids: Modeling, Control, and Optimization. The IMA Volumes in Mathematics and its Applications. Vol. 162. New York: Springer. pp. 105–127. doi:10.1007/978-1-4939-7822-9_5. ISBN 978-1-4939-7821-2.
