= Congestion management =

Congestion management may refer to:

- Traffic congestion in transportation networks
- Network congestion in computer networks
- Transmission congestion in electrical grids
