= Non-wires alternatives =

Non-wires alternatives (NWAs) are electric utility system investments and operating practices that can defer or replace the need for specific transmission and/or distribution projects, at lower total resource cost, by reliably reducing transmission congestion or distribution system constraints at times of maximum demand in specific grid areas. Transmission-related NWAs are also known as non-transmission alternatives (NTAs). They can be identified through least-cost planning and action, one geographic area at a time, for managing electricity supply and demand using all means available and necessary, including demand response, distributed generation (DG), energy efficiency, electricity and thermal storage, load management, and rate design.

== Examples of States Using NWAs ==
- Maine's Booth Bay Harbor Pilot Project
- California “loading order” and energy storage mandates
- Public purpose, including microgrid projects under development in Connecticut, Maryland, Massachusetts, New Jersey and New York
- Massachusetts’ required grid modernization plans
- New York's Brooklyn/Queens Demand Management Program
- Vermont's transmission deferral projects
