= Transmission rights =

Transmission rights may refer to:

- Broadcasting rights in mass media
- Transmission rights (electricity market)
