= World Alliance for Decentralized Energy =

The World Alliance for Decentralized Energy (WADE) was founded in 1997 with the original name of the International Cogeneration Alliance. It was originally formed in response to the UNFCCC meetings in Kyoto to raise the profile of cogeneration on the agenda. In 2002 the organization changed its name to WADE and broadened its scope to include all forms of decentralized energy or distributed generation including renewable technologies such as solar PV and small scale wind power.

== See also ==
- Decentralized energy
