= Virtual bidding =

Virtual bidding is a strategy implemented in various Independent System Operator electricity markets of trading Day-Ahead prices against Real-Time (or Hour-Ahead) prices. The term "bid" can be used loosely in electricity markets to refer to an offer to buy or to sell. And the term "virtual" is used to refer to the fact that, while these trades occur in a physical market, virtual trades never entail taking a physical position—because every sell (or buy) Day Ahead will be closed by a buy (or sell) in Real Time. The ISO maintains a trade execution system that ensures all virtual positions will be closed before delivery time. A virtual bidding platform gives financial entities a way to participate in these physical markets, with no physical assets or presence on the grid. They can attempt to capitalize on regular divergences between these markets of different time period for the same underlying (perhaps using time, absolute price levels, or other external variables as conditioning factors). If this strategy of trading one time period against another without the intent (or perhaps even the ability) to deliver or receive physical power is implemented outside of a transaction system that identifies virtual bids and ensures they will be closed, it may be referred to as "implicit" virtual bidding. Virtual positions are included in the same simultaneous feasibility tests and price determination processes as real positions. Thus they can serve to reduce inefficiencies in the market.

Virtual bidding is a form of speculation not dissimilar to futures trading in the other commodity markets. Virtual bidding is the buying and selling of electricity without ever physically producing or consuming it. Instead all trades are offset in a subsequent market thus preventing physical delivery. There are a number of differences between virtual bidding and traditional commodity markets. Prominent amongst these are that virtual bidding occurs in electricity markets that are discrete, whereas most commodity markets allow for continuous trading. In addition virtual bidding usually occurs for very short time horizons, usually between the day-ahead market and the real-time market. There is no reason why it should not occur in different electricity markets. For example, buying and selling monthly contracts for a common delivery point such as the California-Oregon Border (COB) without ever taking physical delivery is extremely similar to virtual trading, although in this latter case the product is not explicitly identified as a virtual product. Identifying virtual trades explicitly occurs in all the organized Independent System Operator-type markets and confers the benefit of not co-mingling truly physical bids with financial bids. This clear delineation prevents the financial act of speculation from unduly affecting the reliability of the electric system.

Virtual bidding is implemented for a number of reasons, not the least of which is the fact that in its absence there is a tendency for implicit virtual bidding to occur, and the presence of this practice tends to create difficulties for grid operators. There are many benefits of virtual bidding besides the fact that its presence creates an appropriate avenue for arbitrage and in essence assists reliability. The most commonly identified benefits are as follows:

== Market power mitigation ==
Often generators reside in load pockets where physical competition is constrained due to insufficient transmission. Virtual bidding allows virtual traders to compete to supply power within the constrained area. For this benefit to exist the type of virtual bidding must allow bid submission at the nodal level or at the constrained area level.

== Mitigation of the monopsony power of load ==
Load is often large enough to influence the market outcome by varying the quantity they bid into the DA market. Virtual bidding mitigates this power by allowing other market participants to simply bid in the load that was under-scheduled.

== Mitigation of supplier market power ==
The mitigation of supplier (generators) market power is commonly accepted but less well documented. For suppliers to exercise market power they would need to withhold generation in the Day-Ahead market (DAM). This is more difficult in the presence of virtual bidding as virtual traders can submit virtual supply to compete away this withholding practice.

== Market efficiency improvements ==
The improvements to market efficiency emerge as the prices in the DA and RT markets tend to converge. This makes pricing less volatile and this decrease, albeit small, is the benefit. Prices will not converge completely as there will still be stochastic differences that were not foreseen between DA and RT, but the narrowing of the price spread leads to greater predictability.

== Risks of virtual bidding ==
The purported benefits of virtual bidding have resulted in it spreading to new ISOs over time. There remain some risks though. The principal risk is that virtual trades will be used to leverage positions in other markets, such as the Financial Transmission Rights market. To prevent this some markets have implemented specific rules to prevent this sort of gaming.

== Mechanics of virtual bidding ==
The ability to insert virtual bids is usually controlled by the host market, and requires specific registration due to the differing characteristics between virtual bids and physical bids. The submission method is generally similar across Independent System Operators.

== External sources ==
- Isemonger, A.G. "The Benefits and Risks of Virtual Bidding in Multi-Settlement Markets," The Electricity Journal, Volume 19, Issue 9, November 2006, Pages 26–36. doi:10.1016/j.tej.2006.09.010
