= Effort Sharing Regulation =

Policy framework

The Effort Sharing Regulation is a policy framework, part of the European Union climate and energy package.

It sets binding national greenhouse gas targets for each of the 27 Member States of the European Union, collectively amounting to a 30% cut in emissions by 2030 (from a 2005 baseline).

Its predecessor, the Effort Sharing Decision, covered the years up to 2020 which collectively amount to a 10% cut in emissions between 2005 and 2020. These cuts cover the areas such as transport, infrastructure, agriculture, and waste.

It is the companion policy to the European Union Emissions Trading System, which covers emission cuts in power and industry.

== Discussion ==
As the starting level of the reduction is actually too high, in the end a reduction of only 25.5% will be achieved, not the desired and declared 30%.
