= New Electricity Trading Arrangements =

UK electricity market trading system

New Electricity Trading Arrangements (NETA) is the system of market trading arrangements under which electricity is traded in the United Kingdom's wholesale electricity market as of 27 March 2001. The arrangements provided that parties could trade off their imbalances close to real time.

== BETTA ==
On 27 October 2003, NETA changed its name to the British Electricity Trading Transmission Arrangements, and expanding to become the single Great Britain electricity market of England, Wales and Scotland.

== See also ==
- Electricity billing in the UK
- National Grid (UK)
- Grid Trade Master Agreement
