= Grid Trade Master Agreement =

UK electricity trading agreement

The Grid Trade Master Agreement (GTMA) is an agreement for trading electricity within the United Kingdom.

It is normally used either when a power station has excess electricity, which it wishes to "sell back" to the power grid, or when the electricity company wishes to buy surplus power to meet a surge in demand, or reduction in supply.

Although electricity is a non-tangible asset, these agreements are used in order to trade guarantees to provide power for a certain length of time.
