= Value of lost load =

The Value of Lost Load (VoLL) is the estimated amount that customers receiving electricity with firm contracts would be willing to pay to avoid a disruption in their electricity service. The value of these losses can be expressed as a customer damage function (CDF). A CDF is defined as:

Loss ($/kW) = ƒ (duration, season, time of day, notice)

Based on the calculated outage cost, a CDF can be obtained for various customer groups. Typically, there are three distinct groups of customers: residential, small and medium commercial/industry and large commercial/industrial. Figure 1 below illustrates the incremental CDFs of these three groups.

Figure 1: Example Customer Damage Functions

The CDF relates the magnitude of customer losses (per kW interrupted) for a given duration of a power outage. While the general shapes of all three curves are similar, the magnitude of loss varies dramatically depending on the customer's size. Based on VoLL data from an EGAT survey in March and April 2000, it was estimated that the customers’ costs in the first hour for residential customers was Baht 11.45/kW. For large commercial/industrial (C/I) and small & medium C/I customers, the cost in the first hour was Baht 29.55/kW and Baht 89.50 /kW respectively. Further research from EPRI indicates that residential customers’ cost tend to peak at US$1.50/kW in the first hour and falls of to US$0.46/kW in subsequent hours. On the other hand, large C/I and small & medium C/I suffer much higher losses of US$10/kW and US$38/kW respectively in the first hour. This falls to US$4/kW and US$9/kW respectively in the subsequent hours.

The CDF predicts the loss per interrupted kW based on factors that influence the outage. The CDF is usually calculated based on defined market segments such as residential, commercial, and industrial. This is done because there are large variations of costs across the utility market segments. However, in a large area it is a normal practice that the interruption cost is aggregated to represent a general picture of the load losses. The aggregated interruption cost is called the composite CDF.
