= Load pocket =

A load pocket is an area of electric grid (typically small) that has limited ability to import electricity due to either very high concentration of demand or insufficient transmission capabilities (transmission congestion) and therefore cannot be entirely provided with power without participation of local electricity generation providers. A typical load pocket includes a major city (e.g., New York City, San Francisco, San Diego in the US). Load pocket's existence usually indicates difficulties with building of either new generation or new transmission, or both due to the area constraints or political pressure and despite the pocket being an attractive place for investment (market congestion pricing strongly incentivizes new generation inside the pocket). The load pockets represent a problem for the deregulated electricity markets, as in the absence of regulation the captive customers are forced to accept the prices set by the local providers.

== Effect on restructured energy markets ==
In the restructured electricity markets load pockets create a new problem absent in the "traditional" (vertically integrated) electricity markets: maintaining enough transmission/generation capacity for a competitive market to work is prohibitively inefficient, so local generators might gain oligopolic market power and ability to control prices, especially at peak load or during an outage at a large generation facility. This makes withholding capacity to artificially create an electricity shortage rational, forcing introduction of price caps by the regulation authority. The caps in turn can create a missing money problem.

Load pockets provide good examples of market friction:

- "not in my backyard" effect (typical in the urban areas) causes the construction of new power plants or overhead transmission lines to be a non-starter in a political sense;
- price caps and centralized unit commitment by the regional transmission organizations depress the prices for the offline reserve capacity, making construction of new fossil fuel turbines (necessary for the grid reliability) uneconomical;
- construction of new transmission is also opposed by the holders of financial transmission rights (FTR) as it dilutes the value of the existing FTRs.

Load pockets also create reliability concerns.

=== Compensating providers in the load pocket ===
An extremely simplified example can be used to illustrate the need to compensate the providers in the load pocket beyond the level defined by the wide market pricing:

- the system is split into 'north' and 'south', with a constrained transmission line between them;
- the transmission line capacity is not enough to satisfy all demand in the north;
- north has a single provider with an old plant and high marginal cost, south has multiple competitive generators.

Under these conditions, the north is a load pocket; an attempt to create a separate market for it would fail due to monopolistic power the local provider would have, while sweeping both north and south into a single market will cause this market to clear at the price that does not cover the operating costs in the north. Therefore, some mechanism of compensation for the north's generator that does not depend on the market price is required.

=== Reliability must run contracts ===
Reliability must run (RMR) contracts were created as a tool to temporarily keep an ageing plant in operation in a case it is needed for the reliability reasons despite its high operating costs. RMR is a relatively long-term contract (a year or more) between an independent system operator (ISO) and the generator to produce electricity with a cost-plus pricing. RMRs are used to compensate the incumbent providers in the load pockets.

=== Other ways of handling the problem ===
In addition to the price caps and RMRs, the system operators deal with the load pocket problems through a combination of different approaches:

- designating some transmission paths as "non-competitive". If a trial run of the dispatch algorithm excluding the non-competitive paths raises the dispatch level of some units, these units are subjected to local power mitigation measures;
- introducing location pricing in the capacity markets;
- using locational marginal pricing (LMP);
- forcing units to operate out of the merit order;
- using scarcity pricing in the designated regions.

== Sources ==
- Committee on Energy and Commerce, United States Congress (2005). "FERC response". The Energy Policy Act of 2005: hearings before the Subcommittee on Energy and Air Quality of the Committee on Energy and Commerce, House of Representatives, One Hundred Ninth Congress, first session, February 10 and February 16, 2005. U.S. Government Printing Office. ISBN 978-0-16-074752-6. OCLC 1108906604.
- Cramton, Peter; Stoft, Steven (August 2005). "A Capacity Market that Makes Sense" (PDF). The Electricity Journal. 18 (7): 43–54. Bibcode:2005ElecJ..18g..43C. doi:10.1016/j.tej.2005.07.003. ISSN 1040-6190. S2CID 7741124.
- Newbery, David (July 2016). "Missing money and missing markets: Reliability, capacity auctions and interconnectors" (PDF). Energy Policy. 94: 401–410. Bibcode:2016EnPol..94..401N. doi:10.1016/j.enpol.2015.10.028. ISSN 0301-4215.
- Benjamin, Richard (2008). "Generation, Transmission, and the Load Pocket Problem" (PDF). IAEE Energy Forum. 2nd quarter: 23–28.
- Wolak, Frank A.; Bushnell, James (April 2, 1999). "Reliability Must-Run Contracts for the California Electricity Market" (PDF). Market Surveillance Committee of the California ISO.
