= European Union climate and energy package =

The European plan on climate change consists of a range of measures adopted by the members of the European Union to fight against climate change. The plan was launched in March 2007, and after months of tough negotiations between the member countries, it was adopted by the European Parliament in December 2008. The package focuses on emissions cuts, renewables and energy efficiency.

== Timeline ==
10 January 2007: The European Commission presented a series of proposals setting ambitious targets of greenhouse gases reduction. It announced the EU would commit itself to reducing emissions of developed countries by 30% (compared to 1990 levels) by 2020 in international negotiations. In addition, the Commission planned its commitment to reduce its domestic emissions by at least 20% by 2020.

8–9 March 2007: The European Council approved of the objectives of reducing emissions of greenhouse gases presented by the commission on 10 January 2007. As part of a plan of action on energy policy for the period 2007–2009, it also supported the 20-20-20 targets.

23 January 2008: The European Commission presented the definitive package, including proposals outlined by the European Council. The plan was to be discussed and adopted by the European Council in March 2008. The commission also proposed to extend the system of emissions trading, to impose reductions of GHG emissions to economic sectors that are not covered by the system, and to promote renewable energies.

13–14 March 2008: The European Council agreed on the guiding principles of the package and set an agenda.

11–18 December 2008: Discussion about the package during the European Council, and definitive adoption of the package by the European Parliament.

December 2009: World Climate Conference in Copenhagen to find an international agreement to succeed the Kyoto Protocol on Climate Change, which expires at the end of 2012.

== Origin and adoption ==
After the Kyoto Protocol, signed in 1997 by most European countries but expiring in 2012, a new international agreement to reduce emissions of greenhouse gases was to be negotiated at Poznan (Poland) and in Copenhagen in 2009. To play a leading role in these negotiations, the European Union wanted to develop as quickly as possible a common position in the fight against climate change, and thus implemented its own measures to deal with climate change.

=== Initial propositions ===
Meeting on 8 and 9 March 2007, the European Council adopted new environmental targets even more ambitious than that of the Kyoto Protocol. The plan included the so-called "three 20 targets", but in reality it consisted in four proposals. These aims were:

- To reduce emissions of greenhouse gases by 20% by 2020 taking 1990 emissions as the reference.
- To increase energy efficiency to save 20% of EU energy consumption by 2020.
- To reach 20% of renewable energy in the total energy consumption in the EU by 2020.
- To reach 10% of biofuels in the total consumption of vehicles by 2020.

=== Propositions by the Commission ===
After having launched the negotiations on the package by proposing to implement measures to fight against climate change in January 2007, the European Commission proposed new measures a year later. The proposals include the three "20 targets" of the previous European Council.

The new guidelines set by the Commission proposed a limit of CO_{2} emissions by vehicles, to develop capture and storage of CO_{2}, to invite each member state to reduce their greenhouse gases emissions, and to reform the European emission trading system. This last proposal was subject to much debate between the member states. The Commission proposed first to extend this system from 2013, and to extend it to all greenhouse gases instead of restricting it to CO_{2} emissions. It also proposed to extend emission ceilings to more sectors and industries. It finally planned to end free allocation and to switch to paying quotas in 2013 for all power producers, and by 2020 for other industries.

=== Final adoption ===
The plan was concluded rapidly: it was adopted at the European Council on 11 and 12 December 2008, and was voted by the European Parliament one week later. The initial deadline for the adoption of the package in the Parliament was March 2009. However, protests from some countries arose regarding the modalities for achieving these objectives, notably because of the Great Recession, which caused tough negotiations between countries.

The European Council of 11 and 12 December 2008 definitively adopted the package, but modified the initial measures. The 27 Heads of State and governments finally agreed to implement the 20-20-20 targets: by 2020, reduce by 20% the emissions of greenhouse gases compared to 1990 levels, increase by 20% the energy efficiency in the EU and to reach 20% of renewables in total energy consumption in the EU. As for the auctioning of emission of greenhouse gases, a gradual introduction is scheduled: companies will have to buy 20% of allowances from 2013, 70% in 2020 and 100% in 2027. However, if no international agreement is reached in the next years, the industrial companies most exposed to international competition will benefit free allocation of quotas. Finally, in the sector of electricity, exceptions are envisaged for the new member states until 2020, while the auctioning of all the allowances will be effective from 2013 for other EU members. The package was then submitted to the European Parliament from 15 to 18 December. The EU aims to lead the world towards climate neutrality by the year 2050.

== Debates ==
During the negotiations, some member states have expressed concerns about the increase in energy costs caused by the implementation of the package: the increase could be of 10% to 15% by 2020. Above all, several countries were concerned about the supposed consequences of the auctioning of all emissions of greenhouse gases on electricity prices, on the one hand, and above all on the competitiveness of the most polluting industrial companies.

Poland and most new member states, whose electricity relies mainly on coal, fear that this reform, increasing electricity prices, could undermine their economic growth and their energy security. They wanted to benefit from a derogation allowing a progressive switch to paying quotas, starting at 20% in 2013 to reach 100% in 2020. Poland and the Baltic States also claimed that the package would force them to develop their gas imports from Russia to reduce their GHG emissions, limiting their energy independence. The member states responded by proposing to improve the electrical interconnections of these countries with the European market. In late October, the Prime Ministers of Poland, Sweden, Finland, Estonia, Latvia and Lithuania agreed to establish a plan of energy interconnection.

On the other hand, member states disputed on how to avoid the outsourcings of the most polluting industries, subject to competition of rivals from countries with little involvement in the fight against global warming. Germany proposed the allocation of free emission quotas to the most vulnerable (especially steel industry) companies.

== See also ==
- Climate and energy
- Climate of Europe
- Climate change in the European Union
- Effort Sharing Regulation
- Energy policy of the European Union
- European Climate Change Programme
- European Environment Agency
- Third Energy Package
