= Encompass Technologies =

- Type: Corporation
- Industry: Beverage Distributing; Software
- Founded: 2001; 25 years ago
- Founder: Jonathan O'Neil; Kent O'Neil
- Headquarters: Colorado, U.S.
- Products: Enterprise Resource Planning; WMS; Voice-Directed Order Picking; IOT-hardware
- Website: encompasstech.com

Encompass Technologies is an American multinational enterprise resource planning (ERP/RAS) and beverage production management software corporation headquartered in Fort Collins, Colorado. Encompass develops three native, cloud-based softwares:

1. Distribution Cloud: A beverage distribution management software for beverage distributors, wholesalers and retailers.
2. Production Cloud: A production software for beverage producers (such as beer, spirits, THC, cider, etc.)
3. vintrace: A wine production software for wineries.

Its slogan is “Optimizing the beverage supply chain from maker to market”.

Encompass has 200+ employees, 2600+ customers, 562k+ serviced retailers, 2M+ active users, $1.5B monthly retail transactions, and customers in 19 countries.

== History ==
In 2020, Encompass merged with Orchestra Software and acquired Handoff to provide SaaS solutions with the entire supply chain of brewers, distilleries, distributors, and retailers.

The O'Neil family established Encompass Technologies in late 2001.

Encompass became the first cloud-based warehouse management system in 2011.

In January 2015, the Fort Collins headquarters transferred to the completed location at 420 Linden Street. The location is shared with upstairs apartments and is estimated to generate $1.2 million in additional tax revenue for Fort Collins through 2031.

In October 2020, Encompass Technologies merged with Orchestra Software, a Portland, Oregon-based software and services solution for the craft beverage industry.

In November 2020, Encompass acquired Handoff, a Denver-based alcohol delivery startup that serves retailers.

In 2022, Encompass acquired vintrace, an Australian wine production software company.

In 2025, Encompass acquired eVineyard, a Slovenian vineyard management software company.

== Products ==
=== Distribution Cloud ===
Distribution Cloud is an ERP platform for beverage distributors built on the Snowflake database. It includes modules for warehouse management, logistics, and finance.

Capabilities include: portfolio management, sales, market and eCommerce execution, warehouse management, routing and logistics, reporting and analytics, financial management, supplier collaboration, and integrations.

Often categorized as a Route Accounting System (RAS) or Enterprise Resource Planning (ERP) system, Encompass has since expanded its capabilities beyond the original use case of the solution to support suppliers and retailers as well.

=== Production Cloud ===
Encompass Production Cloud is a solution for beverage production management. Producers use the platform to manage production and business operations.

Typically used by craft breweries to brew beer, the solution can also be used to produce spirits, kombucha, THC-based beverages, Non-Alcoholic beverages, Ciders, Flavored Malt Beverages, and Ready to Drink (RTD) beverages.

Capabilities include inventory, production, sales, finance, reporting, quality control, self-distribution, brewers report of operations, and product information management.

For distilleries, capabilities also include contract production, spirit blending, barrel management, and distillers report of operations.

=== vintrace ===
vintrace is a wine production software. It was founded in Australia in 2007 with the mission to create a modern, cloud-based solution for winemakers. vintrace has 7600 users across 19 countries.

Capabilities include dry goods tracking and management, bottling logistics, inventory management, reporting, TTB compliance, direct purchasing and sales, and work process management.

vintrace has both SOC 1 Type 2 and SOC 2 Type 2 certifications.

== Partnerships ==
In March 2025, Encompass announced their partnership with Southern Crown Partners, an Anheuser-Busch wholesaler in South Carolina in the Southeast region. Southern Crown Partners developed a mileage tracking solution within the Encompass platform with similar functionality to softwares like Everlance or Motus (who have now merged). The partnership entails a long-term, multi-product handover to Encompass for further research and development investment, as well as deployment to the rest of their customer base. The first of these solutions was for mileage tracking, which Encompass has now branded, Mileage Tracker, an optional add-on to their Distribution Cloud solution.

In June 2025, Encompass announced a partnership with Stripe to release PayLink Capital. The premise is that Stripe will provide access to capital to distributors quicker than traditional processes.
