= HUPX Hungarian Power Exchange =

Hungarian Power energy system

HUPX logo

HUPX Hungarian Power Exchange is the day-ahead power market which was launched in July 2010 as part of the liberalization of the Hungarian energy sector.

== Markets and products ==
HUPX intraday market enables members to trade 15-minute intraday products on the Hungarian Power Exchange. An organized intraday market provides more opportunities for market players to reduce their need for imbalance energy, to optimize power generation closer in time to delivery and it is also appropriate for managing forecast errors or unforeseen power plant outages.

HUPX is also offering physically settled futures trading. This market provides weekly, monthly, quarterly and yearly baseload/peakload contracts. Since the fourth quarter of 2015 initiator transaction fee was reduced to 0 EUR/MWh, which contributed to a significant boost in the liquidity. The traded volumes jumped from 3 627,3 GWh in 2014 to 6 485,6 GWh in 2015. On 1 January 2016 HUPX PHF listed 31 members. In addition to the settlement of transactions concluded on the exchange, OTC transactions can be registered as well.

== Market coupling ==
4M MC is an ATC-based day-ahead implicit allocation process striving on the compatibility with the EU target model while taking into account the fact that 4M solution is to be considered as an interim step before the Central Eastern European (“CEE”) regional solution. The primary target of the market coupling is to assure a deeper integration of regional power markets. The process aims at maximizing the energy flow from the low price area to the high price area by taking into account the available cross-border capacity. Consequently, price levels among the individual market areas converge. By this procedure, not only the security of supply can be increased but the price volatility on relevant power markets can be moderated and the power sale and purchase can become more effective. The Czech, Slovak, Hungarian and Romanian NRAs, TSOs and PXs jointly implemented the extension of CZ-SK-HU market coupling to Romanian day-ahead electricity market (4M MC)] on 19 November 2014 based on PCR solution.

== Type of HUPX members ==
According to the prevailing regulations of the Hungarian Electric Energy Act, there are six types of entities that can become HUPX members:

- Electricity trader (with a valid electricity trading permit issued by the Hungarian Energy Office pursuant to section 88 of the Electric Energy Act);
- Universal service provider (with a valid universal service provision permit issued by the Hungarian Energy Office pursuant to section 90 of the Electric Energy Act);
- Consumer (on the base of point c of subsection 2 of section 56 of the Electric Energy Act);
- Producer (with a valid power plant or micro power plant operational permit issued by the Hungarian Energy Office pursuant to section 80 or 83 of the Electric Energy Act);
- Transmission system operator (with a valid transmission system operation permit issued by the Hungarian Energy Office pursuant to section 87 of the Electric Energy Act);
- Distribution System Operator (with a valid distribution system operation permit issued by the Hungarian Energy Office pursuant to section 84 of the Electric Energy Act).
