= Transmission congestion =

Inability of electric transmission lines to carry more power without overheating

In power engineering, transmission congestion occurs when overloaded transmission lines in an electrical grid are unable to carry additional electricity flow due to the risk of overheating. During grid congestion, the transmission system operator (TSO) has to direct the providers to adjust their dispatch levels to accommodate the constraint. In an electricity market a power plant may be able to produce electricity at a competitive price but cannot transmit the power to a willing buyer. Congestion increases the electricity prices for some customers.

== Definitions ==
There is no universally accepted definition of the transmission congestion. Congestion is not an event, so it is frequently not possible to pinpoint its place and time (in this respect it is similar to traffic congestion). Regulators define congestion as a condition that prevents market transactions from being completed, while a transmission system operator sees it as inability to maintain the security of the power system operation with the power flow scheduled for the grid.

A congestion is a symptom of a constraint or a combination of constraints in a transmission system, usually the limits on physical electricity flow are used to prevent the overheating, unacceptable voltage levels, and loss of system stability. Congestion can be permanent, an effect of the system configuration, or temporary, due to a fault in the transmission equipment.

== Congestion management ==
Avoiding the congestion is essential for a competitive electricity market and is "one of the toughest problems" of its design. The goal is to ensure that a power flow as defined by the wholesale market result does not violate the constraints during the normal operation of the grid and in the case of failure of any one particular component (so called n-1 criterion).

The existing markets use a range of approaches to solve the problem. On one end of this range is "uniform pricing" that ignores the transmission constraints altogether and lets the market find a single price for all the locations ("nodes"). On the other end "locational marginal pricing" accommodates all the constraints by defining a separate pricing for each node (thus another name, "nodal pricing").

The uniform pricing has an advantage of transparent market design and quick clearing, so auctions can happen frequently, typically they start a day ahead of the delivery ("day-ahead" auction) and continue until the delivery (so called "intra-day" auctions). However, the market result might violate the congestion constraints and thus cannot be implemented at the time of delivery (in "real-time"). If this is the case, the TSO intervenes and uses so called system redispatch by changing the schedules of the generators in a way that the load can be served. Redispatch payments are usually negotiated in advance and providers are paid as they bid in a "command and control" fashion, without creating a market.

With nodal pricing all grid constraints are accounted for during the clearing and different prices are set for different nodes, this typically requires the independent system operator (ISO) to manage the market clearing. The drawback of the nodal pricing is that the local markets might not have enough participants to efficiently function. In particular, in the load pockets (areas of the grid with concentrated load and lack of tie lines to the rest of the system) a large generator might exhibit significant market power, forcing the price for this node to be directly regulated on a cost basis.

The zonal pricing represents a compromise where the grid is split into relatively large zones, electricity price within each zone is uniform (and thus intra-zone congestion need to be resolved with a redispatch), but the inter-zone constraints are accounted for during the market clearing via different prices for different zones.

The "discriminatory pricing" the providers in case of acceptance of their bids by the system operator are paid the amount of their bid ("pay-as-offered", "pay-as-bid"). The discriminatory pricing is also used in a market-based redispatch scenario (counter-trading).

== Transmission rights ==
To avoid congestion, it might be necessary to deny some transmission transactions. One way to do it is through the transmission rights. The owner of a transmission right is entitled to transport a predefined amount of electric power from a source location on the network to the destination. There are two types of transmission rights:

- physical transmission right (PTR) provides a property right to a portion of a capacity of a transmission line, which is reserved for the holder's exclusive use (the holder can deny access to the transmission capacity to non-holders. ). The right can be acquired by building a transmission line or by purchasing the right from some other holder, so costs are typically known in advance. The owner can "sublet" the capacity to supplement the return on investment (for example, at a time when the capacity is not being used). The PTRs are essentially self-scheduling and in practice not only can interfere with the ability of a system operator to perform the economic dispatch, but are incompatible with locational marginal pricing, as the holder of a right from, say, A to B, can artificially increase prices in B (and lower prices in A) by simply withholding the access;
- financial transmission right (FTR) is similar to PTR in appearance (it specifies the source, destination, and power in MW), but does not reserve the line yet instead provides its holder with a payout that is equal to the difference in the price of electricity between the source and the destination (form of a congestion rent). The funds for the payment are collected whenever the electricity is purchased in the lower-cost location and resold in a higher-cost one, so the FTRs cannot be used in a uniform pricing market arrangement.

=== Example of an FTR operation ===
In a simple example of FTR operation, locations A and B are connected with a 1000 MW line. Location A has a load of 200 MW and two generation companies:

- GA1 with 1000 MW capacity and marginal cost of $10/MW;
- GA2 with 1000 MW capacity and marginal cost of $15/MW.

Location B has a load of 2500 MW and a single generator GB with 2000 MW capacity and marginal cost of $30/MW.

The electricity market with locational pricing will fully engage the 1000 MW line and settle on:

- $15 at location A, as GA1 cannot satisfy all demand (transmission line plus local load) and the price will be thus determined by GA2;
- $30 at B: the transmission line cannot satisfy all local load and the price is thus determined by GB.

GA1, standing to gain most if the links between A and B are improved, decides to build another 1000-MW transmission line. Now there is no congestion, and the market will settle at the same price in both A and B ($30, since GA1 and GA2 cannot satisfy all demand, and the price will be determined by the cost of GB). GA1 will hold the FTR for 1000 MW, but will not collect anything from this right, instead pocketing the difference between its $10 cost and $30 price.

A new plant, GA3, is constructed in A with capacity of 1000 MW and marginal cost of $9/MW. Now the pricing in A is $15 again (determined by GA2), pricing at B is still $30. Although the line built by GA1 might now be effectively used by GA3, GA1 as a holder of FTR receives the congestion rent for electricity transmitted over the line that GA1 had invested into. The arrangement works as if GA1 had leased the line to GA3 for the full value of the line, so FTRs are similar to tradable securities, but with automated trading.

=== Transmission access charge ===
Some transmission system operators offer the transmission rights owner to collect the transmission fees for them. For example, in California the California Independent System Operator (CAISO) offers the PTR owners a scheme where the owners hand over the operational control of their infrastructure to CAISO in exchange for the "Transmission Revenue Requirement" (TRR) that recoups the owner's costs. CAISO in turn collects the Transmission Access Charge (TAC) from the utilities based on the gross load, and utilities bill TAC to their customers.

== Sources ==
- Zimmerman, Charles (1 January 2004). "Cross-Border Capacity Allocation Methods". In Janusz Bielecki; Melaku Geboye Desta (eds.). Electricity Trade in Europe: Review of Economic and Regulatory Challenges. Kluwer Law International B.V. pp. 212–234. ISBN 978-90-411-2279-7. OCLC 1044101869.
- ENSO (April 2001). "Key Concepts and Definitions for Transmission Access Products" (Final Report). entsoe.eu. ENTSO-E.
- Staudt, Philipp (2019). Transmission Congestion Management in Electricity Grids (PhD). Karlsruhe Institute of Technology.
- Lyons, Karen; Fraser, Hamish; Parmesano, Hethie (December 2000). "An Introduction to Financial Transmission Rights". The Electricity Journal. 13 (10): 31–37. doi:10.1016/S1040-6190(00)00164-0. ISSN 1040-6190.
- Holmberg, Pär; Lazarczyk, Ewa (1 April 2015). "Comparison of congestion management techniques: Nodal, zonal and discriminatory pricing". The Energy Journal. 36 (2). doi:10.5547/01956574.36.2.7. ISSN 0195-6574. JSTOR 24695751.
- Rassenti, Stephen J.; Smith, Vernon L.; Wilson, Bart J. (2003). "Discriminatory Price Auctions in Electricity Markets: Low Volatility at the Expense of High Price Levels". Journal of Regulatory Economics. 23 (2): 109–123. doi:10.1023/A:1022250812631. ISSN 0922-680X.
