= Carlos Alberto =

Carlos Alberto is a common Portuguese and Spanish given name (in English Charles Albert, in Italian Carlo Alberto).

It is the name of several people:

== Musicians ==
- Braguinha (composer) (1907–2006), real name Carlos Alberto Ferreira Braga, Brazilian singer-songwriter, also known as "João de Barro"
- Charly García (born 1951), real name Carlos Alberto García, Argentine singer-songwriter
- Nito Mestre (born 1952), real name Carlos Alberto Mestre, Argentine musician

== Politicians ==
- Carlos Alberto Arroyo del Río (1893–1969), 26th President of Ecuador
- Carlos Alberto Baena López (born 1967), Colombian lawyer and politician
- Carlos Alberto Brenes Jarquín (1884–1942), Nicaraguan politician and former president of Nicaragua
- Carlos Alberto do Vale Gomes Carvalhas GCC (born 1941), Portuguese economist and politician
- Carlos Alberto Duque Jaén (1930–2014), Panamanian businessman and politician
- Carlos Alberto Flores Gutiérrez (born 1974), Mexican politician
- Carlos Alberto García González (born 1971), Mexican politician
- Carlos Alberto Lacoste (1929–2004), Argentine navy vice-admiral and politician
- Carlos Alberto Madero Erazo, Honduran politician
- Carlos Alberto Madrazo Becerra (1915–1969), reformist Mexican politician
- Carlos Alberto da Mota Pinto (1936–1985), Portuguese professor and politician
- Carlos Alberto Pérez Cuevas (born 1974), Mexican politician
- Carlos Alberto Puente Salas (born 1971), Mexican politician
- Carlos Alberto Richa (born 1965), Brazilian politician
- Carlos Alberto Torres Caro, Peruvian politician
- Carlos Alberto Torres Torres (born 1975), Mexican politician
- Carlos Alberto Brilhante Ustra (1932–2015), Brazilian army official and politician
- Carlos Alberto Torres (Puerto Rican nationalist) (born 1952), longest-serving Puerto Rican political prisoner

== Sportspeople ==
=== Football ===
- Alfinete (born 1961), full name Carlos Alberto Dario de Oliveira, retired Brazilian footballer
- Carlos Alberto (footballer, born 1932), full name Carlos Alberto Martins Cavalheiro, Brazilian football goalkeeper
- Betinho (footballer, born May 1987), full name Carlos Alberto Santos da Silva, Brazilian footballer
- Cabralzinho (born 1945), full name Carlos Roberto Ferreira Cabral, Brazilian football manager and former footballer
- Careca Bianchezi (born 1964), full name Carlos Alberto Bianchezi, Brazilian former footballer
- Carlos Alberto (footballer, born 1974), Carlos Alberto Ribeiro Pereira, Brazilian football defender
- Carlinhos (footballer, born 1980), full name Carlos Alberto de Almeida Junior, Brazilian midfielder for Bangu
- Carlinhos (footballer, born 1990), full name Carlos Alberto Rogger Dias, Brazilian footballer
- Carlitos (footballer, born 1921) (1921–2001), full name Carlos Alberto Zolim Filho, Brazilian footballer
- Carlitos (footballer, born 1982), full name Carlos Alberto Alves Garcia, Portuguese winger for FC Sion
- Carlos (footballer, born 1995), full name Carlos Alberto Carvalho da Silva Júnior, Brazilian forward for C.D. Santa Clara
- Carlos Alberto (footballer, born 1953), full name Carlos Alberto Sotelho de Souza, Brazilian right back
- Carlos Alberto (footballer, born 1978), full name Carlos Alberto de Oliveira Júnior, Brazilian midfielder for Joinville
- Carlos Alberto (footballer, born 1980), full name Carlos Alberto dos Santos Gomes, Brazilian footballer
- Carlos Alberto (footballer, born 1981), full name Carlos Alberto Pereira Silveira, Brazilian footballer
- Carlos Alberto (footballer, born January 1984), full name Carlos Alberto Souto Pinheiro Júnior, Brazilian footballer
- Carlos Alberto (footballer, born December 1984), full name Carlos Alberto Gomes de Jesus, Brazilian midfielder
- Carlos Alberto (footballer, born 1987), full name Carlos Alberto Gomes de Lima, Brazilian striker
- Carlos Alberto (footballer, born 1988), full name Carlos Alberto da Silva Gonçalves Júnior, Brazilian footballer
- Carlos Alberto (footballer, born 2002), full name Carlos Alberto Gomes da Silva Filho, Brazilian footballer
- Carlos Alberto Babington (born 1949), Argentine footballer
- Carlos Alberto Bulla (born 1943), Argentine footballer
- Carlos Campos (footballer, born 1992), full name Carlos Alberto Campos Ávila, Mexican footballer
- Carlos Alberto Lourenço Cardoso (born 1944), Portuguese football manager and former footballer
- Carlos Alberto Chacana (born 1976), Argentine footballer playing in Israel
- Carlos Alberto Cuevas Maldonado (born 1986), Mexican footballer
- Carlos Alberto de Toro (born 1963), Argentine footballer
- Carlos Alberto Costa Dias (born 1967), Brazilian footballer
- Carlos Alberto Díaz (born 1982), Colombian footballer
- Carlos Alberto Etcheverry D'Angelo (1933–2014), Argentine footballer
- Carlos Fernandes (footballer, born 1979), full name Carlos Alberto Fernandes, Angolan footballer
- Carlos Alberto García Charcopa (born 1978), Ecuadoran footballer
- Carlos Alberto Galeana Irra (born 1988), Mexican footballer
- Carlos Alberto Gutiérrez Armas (born 1990), Mexican footballer
- Carlos Alberto Hurtado Arteaga (born 1984), Mexican footballer
- Carlos Alberto Kiese Wiesner (born 1957), Paraguayan footballer
- Carlos Alberto Lugo Gamboa (born 1993), Mexican footballer
- Carlos Alberto Madeo (born 1981), Argentine footballer
- Carlos Alberto (footballer, born 1932) (1932–2012), Brazilian footballer
- Carlos Alberto Massara (born 1978), Argentine footballer who played in Greece
- Carlos Alberto Mayor (born 1965), Argentine football manager and former footballer
- Carlos Alberto Mijangos Castro (born 1951), Guatemalan football manager and former footballer
- Carlos Alberto Lourenço Milhazes (born 1981), Portuguese former footballer
- Carlos Alberto Palacio Quiñonez (born 1988), Colombian footballer
- Carlos Alberto Parreira (born 1943), Brazilian football manager
- Carlos Alberto Pavón Plummer (born 1973), Honduran footballer
- Carlos Alberto Peña Rodríguez (born 1990), Mexican footballer
- Carlos Alberto Raffo (1926–2013), Argentine footballer
- Carlos Alberto Restrepo Isaza (born 1961), Colombian football manager
- Carlos Alberto Miguel Rodríguez (born 1990), Argentine footballer
- Carlos Alberto Rodrigues (born 1947), Brazilian footballer
- Carlos Alberto Rodrigues Gavião (born 1980), Brazilian footballer
- Carlos Alberto Rodríguez Gómez (born 1997), Mexican footballer
- Carlos Alberto Rodriguez Sanchez (born 1996), Mexican footballer
- Carlos Alberto Sánchez Moreno (born 1986), Colombian footballer
- Carlos Alberto Sánchez Romero (born 1980), Mexican footballer
- Carlos Alberto Souza dos Santos (born 1960), Brazilian retired footballer
- Carlos Alberto de Oliveira Secretário (born 1970), Portuguese retired footballer
- Carlos Alberto Silva (1939–2017), Brazilian football manager
- Carlos Alberto Silva Valente (born 1948), Portuguese referee
- Carlos Alberto (footballer, born January 1984), Brazilian footballer
- Carlos Alberto Tevez (born 1984), Argentine forward for Boca Juniors
- Carlos Alberto Torres (1944–2016), Brazilian footballer, 1970 World Champion
- Carlos Alberto Trejo Sánchez (born 1983), Mexican football goalkeeper
- Carlos Alberto Uribe (born 1969), Colombian footballer
- Carlos Alberto Valencia Paredes (born 1989), Colombian footballer
- Carlos Alberto Valderrama Palacio (born 1961), Colombian footballer
- Carlos Alberto Vela Garrido (born 1989), Mexican footballer for MLS club Los Angeles FC
- Carli de Murga (born 1988), full name Carlos Alberto Martínez de Murga Olaivar, Filipino footballer
- China (footballer, born 1964), full name Carlos Alberto Gomes Kao Yien, Brazilian footballer of Chinese descent
- Duda (footballer, born 1974), full name Carlos Alberto Eduardo Ventura, Brazilian footballer
- Juninho (footballer, born 1977), full name Carlos Alberto Carvalho dos Anjos Junior, Brazilian footballer
- Manaca (born 1946), full name Carlos Alberto Manaca Dias, Mozambican footballer
- Mariano (footballer, born 1975), full name Carlos Alberto Teixeira Mariano, Portuguese former footballer
- Pintinho (born 1954), full name Carlos Alberto Gomes Montero, Brazilian footballer
- Zanata (born 1950), full name Carlos Alberto Zanata Amato, Brazilian footballer

=== Other sportspeople ===
- Carlos Alberto Abaunza (born 1959), Nicaraguan high jumper
- Carlos Alberto Arroyo Bermúdez (born 1979), Puerto Rican basketball player
- Carlos Alberto Batres González (born 1968), Guatemalan football referee
- Carlos Alberto Berlocq (born 1983), Argentine tennis player
- Carlos Alberto Betancur Gómez (born 1989), Colombian road cyclist
- Carlos Alberto Bonacich (born 1931), Argentine swimmer
- Carlos Alberto Casal (born 1946), Uruguayan boxer
- Carlos Alberto Contreras (born 1973), Colombian cyclist
- Carlos Alberto Cunha (born 1959), Brazilian judoka
- Carlos Gastélum (born 1979), Mexican baseball player
- Carlos Alberto de Sousa Lopes (born 1947), Portuguese long-distance runner
- Carlos Alberto Martínez (born 1957), Argentine alpine skier
- Carlos Alberto Maya Lizcano (born 1972), Venezuelan cyclist
- Carlos Alberto Moratorio (1929–2010), Argentine equestrian
- Carlos Alberto Pascual Lus (1931–2011), Cuban baseball pitcher
- Carlos Alberto Ramírez Yepes (born 1994), Colombian BMX rider
- Carlos Alberto Reutemann (born 1942), Argentine former racing driver and politician
- Carlos Alberto Silva Silva (born 1974), Colombian cyclist
- Carlos Alberto Taylhardat (1921–2011), Venezuelan naval captain and diplomat
- Carlos Alberto Tomasi (born 1930), Argentine bobsledder
- Carlos Alberto Urán (born 1980), Colombian cyclist
- Carlos Alberto Valderrama Cordero (born 1977), Venezuelan former baseball player
- Carlos Alberto Vario (born 1947), Argentine former wrestler
- Carlos Alberto Vázquez (born 1934), Argentine former cyclist
- Carlos Alberto Zambrano (born 1981), Venezuelan baseball player

== Other people ==
- Carlos Alberto de Barros Franco (born 1946), Brazilian physician
- Carlos Alberto Cruz Boix (born 1949), Cuban artist
- Carlos Alberto Cabral, 2nd Count of Vizela, Portuguese nobleman
- Carlos Alberto Cardona Ospina (born 1974), Colombian internet entrepreneur
- Carlos Alberto Menezes Direito (1942–2009), Brazilian judge
- Carlos Alberto Gonçalves da Cruz (born 1944), Brazilian herpetologist
- Carlos Alberto Guajardo Romero (1973–2010), Mexican journalist
- Carlos Alberto Leumann (1886–1952), Argentine writer and poet
- Carlos Alberto Montaner (born 1943), Cuban author based in Madrid and Miami
- Carlos Alberto Pellegrini, Argentine surgeon based in Seattle
- Carlos Alberto Reis de Paula (born 1944), Brazilian judge
- Carlos Alberto Rentería Mantilla (born 1945), Colombian former narcotrafficker
- Carlos Alberto Ricardo, Brazilian environmentalist
- Carlos Alberto Riccelli (born 1946), Brazilian actor
- Carlos Alberto Rosales Mendoza (1963–2015), Mexican former drug lord
- Carlos Alberto Sacheri (1933–1974), Argentine philosopher
- Carlos Alberto dos Santos Cruz (born 1952), Brazilian military officer
- Carlos Alberto Seguín (1907–1995), Peruvian physicist
- Carlos Alberto Sicupira (born 1948), Brazilian businessman
- Carlos Alberto Torres (sociologist) (born 1950), professor of social science at UCLA

== See also ==
- Caçador Airport, also known as Carlos Alberto da Costa Neves Airport; based in Caçador, Brazil
- Carlos (disambiguation)
- Alberto (disambiguation)
- Carlo Alberto (disambiguation)
- Carl Albrecht (disambiguation)
