= HVDC Itaipu =

HVDC transmission line in Brazil

- Location of HVDC Itaipu

Location
- Country: Brazil
- Coordinates: 25°27′58″S 54°32′33″W; 23°40′02″S 47°06′19″W
- General direction: East-West
- From: Itaipu hydroelectric power plan, near Foz do Iguaçu
- To: Ibiúna, São Paulo

Ownership information
- Owner: Furnas Centrais Elétricas S.A. Brazil

Construction information
- Substation manufacturer: ABB
- Commissioned: October 1984, July 1987

Technical information
- Type: overhead transmission line
- Current type: HVDC
- Total length: 780 km (480 mi)
- Capacity: 6300 MW
- AC voltage: 345 and 500 kV
- DC voltage: ±600 kV
- No. of poles: 2x2
- No. of circuits: 2

The HVDC Itaipu is a high-voltage direct current overhead line transmission system in Brazil from the Itaipu hydroelectric power plant to the region of São Paulo. The project consists of two ±600 kV bipoles, each with a rated power of 3150 MW, which transmit power generated at 50 Hz from the Paraguay side of the Itaipu Dam (near Foz do Iguaçu in Paraná) to the Ibiúna converter station near São Roque, São Paulo. The system was put in service in several steps between 1984 and 1987, and remains among the most important HVDC installations in the world.

When the first bipole was completed in 1985, it became the world's largest HVDC system by both power transmission capacity and voltage, titles which it would hold for 25 years until the completion, in 2010, of the ±800 kV, 6400 MW HVDC link from Xiangjiaba Dam to Shanghai in China. It also contained important innovations in real-time control systems, being one of the first HVDC schemes to use digital control equipment using microprocessors. Nevertheless, it suffered reliability problems in its first few years of operation, with numerous converter transformer failures and one serious converter fire, although reliability is now reported to be much improved.

== Technical description ==
High Voltage Direct Current (HVDC) was chosen both because this technique allows long transmission lines with little loss compared to other systems (like AC), and also allows interchange of the Paraguayan 50 Hz input and the Brazilian 60 Hz input and user grid. Both lines operate at ±600 kV and are built as overhead lines with a length of 818 (North line) and 807 (South line) kilometers. Away from their terminal stations, the two lines are at least 10 km apart to reduce risks. Each one is designed for 3150 MW at ± 600 kV D.C. and 2625 A. The lines are 4 x 689 mm^{2} (about 30 mm ∅) ACSR

The incoming supply is 500 kV AC from the 50 Hz generators at the hydro dam (Foz do Iguaçu). The outgoing power is 345 and 500 kV, 60 Hz AC into the South/Southeastern grid (Ibiúna, São Paulo).

The converter equipment, supplied by ABB, uses thyristor valves arranged in two, twelve-pulse bridges per pole.

In parallel with the HVDC system, two 765 kV AC lines carry power from the 60 Hz generators on the Brazilian side of the dam to the São Paulo region. At 1/3 into the route, at Ivaiporã, there is a branch into 500 kV, 60 Hz AC, delivering into the Southern grid. By introducing, in 1989 and later, series capacitors in Ivaiporã (at 1/3 of the line) and Itaberá (at 2/3) the capacity grew from 4300 MW to 6300 MW.

== Reliability ==
In its first few years, the project suffered many failures of converter transformers, with six in the first year of commercial operation and twelve in the first four years. Modifications had to be made to all of the transformers on the system, and led to markedly improved performance, with no failures in years 4–10.

On 29 May 1989, a complete quadrivalve in converter 5 of the Foz do Iguaçu converter station was destroyed by a fire which started as a result of a water leakage from a cooling pipe. The affected converter was out of action for 14 months. Similar incidents on the Rihand–Delhi project in 1990 and the Sylmar Converter Station of the Pacific DC Intertie scheme in 1993 led to CIGRÉ publishing guidelines on the design of thyristor valves in order to reduce fire risks.

== Electrodes ==
Each bipole can be operated also as monopole and is equipped with a grounding electrode. The electrode lines of both bipoles are installed on wooden poles and consist of 2 x 689 mm^{2} 1272 MCM conductors.

The electrodes for Foz do Iguaçu Station are situated at Santa Terezinha de Itaipu at 25°29′58″S 54°24′03″W and at Alvorada do Iguaçu at 25°23′32″S 54°27′43″W and are connected to the converter station via lines of 15.5 km and 16 km length respectively.

The electrodes for São Roque Station are situated at Córrego Boa Vista at 23°35′51″S 47°37′37″W and at 23°35′49″S 47°37′06″W and are connected to the converter station via lines of 66 km and 67.2 km length respectively.

== Waypoints ==
Site	Station type	Line	Coordinates
Foz do Iguaçu	Converter Station		25°27′58″S 54°32′33″W
Ortigueira	PLC repeater station	northern line	24°01′51″S 51°05′52″W
Ortigueira	PLC repeater station	southern line	24°19′16″S 50°51′22″W
Ibiúna	Converter Station		23°40′02″S 47°06′19″W

== See also ==
- High-voltage direct current
- HVDC converter station
- HVDC converter
- Electrode line
- List of HVDC projects
