= HVDC Rihand–Delhi =

HVDC transmission line in India

Location
- Country: India
- State: Uttar Pradesh
- Coordinates: 24°01′13″N 82°47′21″E; 28°35′36″N 77°36′16″E
- From: Rihand
- To: Dadri, Gautam Buddha Nagar (near Delhi)

Ownership information
- Owner: Power Grid Corporation of India

Construction information
- Substation installer: ABB, Bharat Heavy Electricals Limited
- Commissioned: 1990

Technical information
- Type: Overhead line
- Current type: HVDC
- Total length: 814 km (506 mi)
- Capacity: 1,500 MW
- DC voltage: ±500 kV
- No. of poles: 2

The HVDC Rihand–Delhi is a HVDC connection between Rihand and Dadri (near Delhi) in India, put into service in 1990. It connects the 3,000 MW coal-based Rihand Thermal Power Station in Uttar Pradesh to the northern region of India. The project has an 814 kilometres (506 mi) long bipolar overhead line. The transmission voltage is 500 kV and the maximum transmission power is 1,500 megawatts. The project was built by ABB.

On 24 June 1990, during the commissioning of the scheme, a complete quadrivalve of the Rihand converter station was destroyed, and the other two quadrivalves of the same pole badly damaged, by a fire which is believed to have started as a result of a loose connection on a grading capacitor. The fire was so intense that the valve hall was structurally damaged, and the affected converter was out of action for 18 months. Similar incidents on the Itaipu project in 1989 and the Sylmar Converter Station of the Pacific DC Intertie scheme in 1993 led to CIGRÉ publishing guidelines on the design of thyristor valves in order to reduce fire risks. In 1996 the National Fire Protection Association published NFPA 850{2} to further enhance fire prevention and protection guidelines base on input from the HVDC manufacturers and utility owners. Since that time, there have been no catastrophic fire incidents in the US or internationally.

HVDC Rihand-Dadri crosses north of E. Manjhpati the HVDC Ballia-Bhiwadi. This is the first crossing of two independent HVDC lines in India and one of the few worldwide.

== Sites ==
| Site | Coordinates |
|---|---|
| Rihand Converter Station | 24°01′13″N 82°47′21″E |
| Chak Chapki Grounding Electrode | 23°58′17″N 83°0′56″E |
| HVDC Rihand-Dadri crosses HVDC Ballia-Bhiwadi | 27°22′36″N 78°52′45″E |
| Dadri Converter Station | 28°35′36″N 77°36′16″E |
| Nanva Ka RajPur Grounding Electrode | 28°22′0″N 77°33′22″E |
