= Baratta =

Baratta is an occupational surname of Italian origin for a market trader. Notable people with this name include:

- Alessandro Baratta (1639–1714), Italian painter and engraver
- Anthony Baratta (born 1938), Italian-American mobster
- Antonio Baratta (1724–1787), Italian engraver
- Carla Baratta (born 1990), Venezuelan actress and model
- Carlo Alberto Baratta (1754 – c. 1815), Italian painter
- Eumone Baratta (1823 – after 1890), Italian sculptor
- Francesco Baratta the elder (c. 1590–1666), Italian Baroque sculptor
- Giovanni Baratta (1670–1747), Italian Baroque sculptor
- Joseph Baratta (born 1971), American businessman
- María de Baratta (1890–1978), Salvadoran ethnomusicologist, composer, and advocate for the preservation of Indigenous heritage
- Paolo Baratta (born 1939), Italian economist
- Pietro Baratta (1659–1729), Italian Baroque sculptor

== See also ==
- Barati (disambiguation)
