= Carlo Alberto (disambiguation) =

Carlo Alberto can refer to:

- Carlo Alberto Guidoboni Cavalchini (1683–1774), Italian cardinal
- Carlo Alberto Baratta (1754–1815), Italian painter
- Charles Albert of Sardinia (1798–1849), king of Piedmont-Sardinia
- Carlo Alberto Castigliano (1847–1884), Italian mathematician and physicist
- Carlo Alberto Pisani Dossi (1849–1910), Italian writer, politician and diplomat
- Carlo Alberto Salustri (1873–1950), Italian poet
- Carlo Alberto Biggini (1902–1945), Italian fascist politician
- Carlo Alberto Quario (1913–1984), Italian footballer and coach
- Carlo Alberto Dalla Chiesa (1920–1982), Italian carabinieri, assassinated by mafia
- Carlo Alberto Chiesa (1922–1960), Italian screenwriter, film editor and director
- Carlo Alberto Tesserin (born 1938), Italian politician
- Carlo Alberto Nucci (born 1956), Italian professor of electrical engineering

== See also ==
- Italian cruiser Carlo Alberto (1892–1920)
- Collegio Carlo Alberto (established in 2004)
- Carl Albrecht (disambiguation)
- Carlos Alberto (disambiguation)
