= EPSR =

EPSR may refer to:

- Economic and Philosophic Science Review
- Electric Power Systems Research
- Employer Pension Scheme Reference, a unique reference given to an employer by the trustees or managers of personal pension scheme or multi-employer occupational schemes in the United Kingdom.
- Ethernet Protection Switching Ring, an Ethernet fault-tolerance technique
- European Plant Science Retreat, an annual congress organized by and for PhD students working in plant biology across Europe.
- European Political Science Review
