= Erazo =

Erazo is a surname. Notable people with the surname include:

- Álex Erazo (born 1980), Salvadoran footballer
- Carlos Alberto Madero Erazo, Honduran minister
- Frickson Erazo (born 1988), Ecuadorian footballer
- Guillermo Ayoví Erazo (born 1930), Ecuadorian musician, singer and marimba player
- Jaime Vela Erazo, Ecuadorian military leader
- Nelson Erazo (athlete) (1959–2017), Puerto Rican track and field athlete
- Rodolfo Erazo (born 1946), Honduran long-distance runner
