= Carlo Alberto Nucci =

- Born: 1956 (age 69–70); Bologna, Italy
- Known for: Editor in Chief of the Electric Power System Research journal
- Awards: IEEE fellow, Honoris causa degree from Bucharest Polytechnic University
- Scientific career
- Fields: Power Electrical Engineering
- Institutions: University of Bologna

Carlo Alberto Nucci is full professor of Electrical Power Systems at the University of Bologna and the Editor in Chief of the Electric Power System Research Journal. He authored or co-authored over 200 science papers in the field of power electrical engineering. Fellow of IEEE for contributions to analysis and modeling of lightning originated phenomena in power systems and IET. He has also been Chair of the IEEE PowerTech Permanent Steering Committee. Nucci is head of the Power Systems Laboratory at the University of Bologna. Together with prof. F. Rachidi of the Swiss Federal Institute of Technology of Lausanne, he has developed a computer code for the appraisal of lightning-induced voltages in electrical network, called LIOV, which is quoted in IEEE standards. Prof. Nucci is also member of the Bologna Science Academy.

His research is currently focused on:

- Power systems electromagnetic transients
- Lightning protection of power systems
- Smart Grids - Distributed generation
- Dynamics of power systems
- Secondary cell for electric vehicles

== Career ==
Nucci received a degree with honors from the University of Bologna, Italy in 1982. In the same University he was appointed a researcher in Power Electrical Engineering in 1983, became a full professor and the chair of Power Systems in 2000. He serves as the chair of Study Committee C4 in Cigre International Council on Large Electric Systems. Since January 2010 he has been the Editor in Chief of the Electric Power System Research journal.

== Personal life ==
Carlo Alberto Nucci was born in Bologna, Italy, in 1956.
