= Ruslan and Lyudmila (opera) =

Opera by Mikhail Glinka

- Opera by Mikhail Glinka
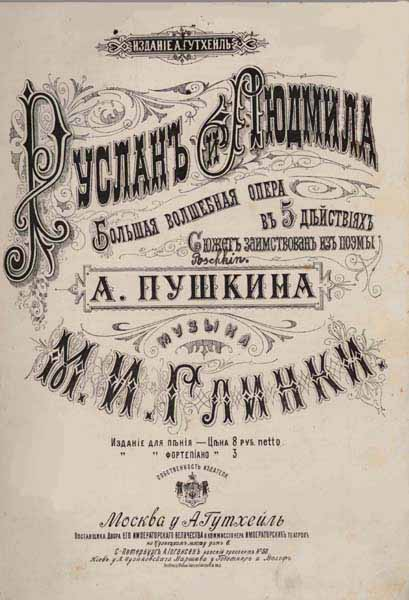
- Title page of a score (A. Gutheil, Moscow, 1885)
- Native title: Russian: Руслан и Людмила
- Librettist: Valerian Shirkov; Nestor Kukolnik; N. A. Markevich
- Language: Russian
- Based on: Ruslan and Ludmila by Alexander Pushkin
- Premiere: 27 November 1842; Bolshoi Kamenny Theatre, Saint Petersburg

Ruslan and Lyudmila (Russian: Руслан и Людмила, romanized: Ruslán i Lyudmíla) is an opera in five acts (eight tableaux) composed by Mikhail Glinka between 1837 and 1842.

The libretto was written in Russian by Valerian Shirkov, with minor contributions by Mykola Markevych, Nestor Kukolnik, and the composer based on the 1820 narrative poem of the same name by Alexander Pushkin. Pushkin had planned to write the libretto himself but died in a duel before he could do so.

Today, the best-known music from the opera is its overture.

== Performance history ==
The premiere took place in Saint Petersburg on 27 November^{(Old Style)} 1842 at the Bolshoi Kamenniy Teatr. The initial lack of enthusiasm for this Russian-inspired production has been attributed to the Saint Petersburg's audience's growing taste at the time for Italian opera, which was so pronounced that in 1843, Tsar Nicholas I established an Italian opera company in the Bolshoi Kamenniy Teatr, and the Russian opera company lost its home. Four years later, the opera was given its Moscow premiere at the Bolshoi Theatre in 1846. The opera has been a mainstay of the Bolshoi, having staged over 700 performances in 9 different productions over the past 165 years.

The opera was first performed in the UK on 4 June 1931 at the Lyceum Theatre in London and in the US as a concert version in New York on 26 December 1942. It was given its first staged performance in the US by Sarah Caldwell's Opera Company of Boston on 5 March 1977.

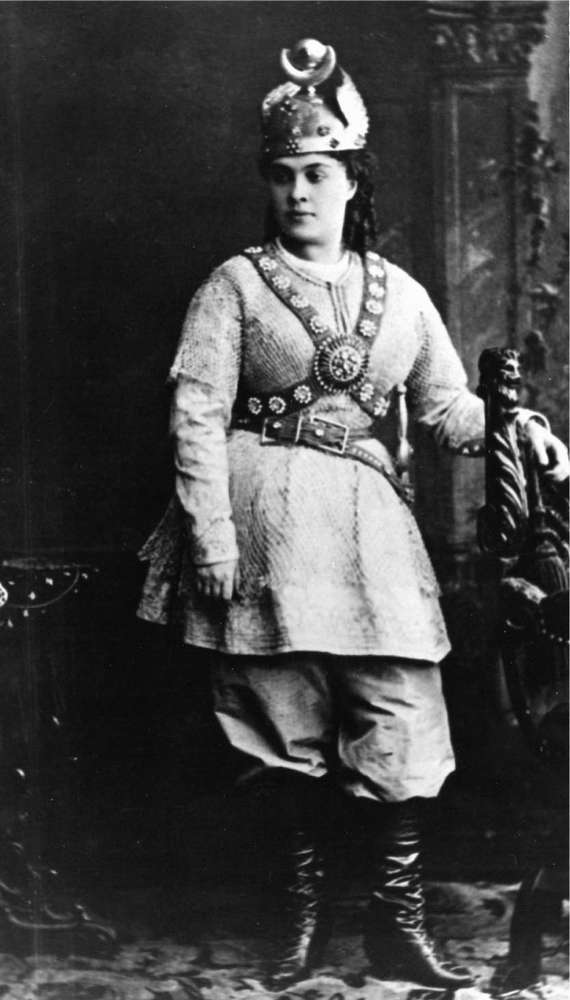
Aleksandra Krutikova as Ratmir (1880s)

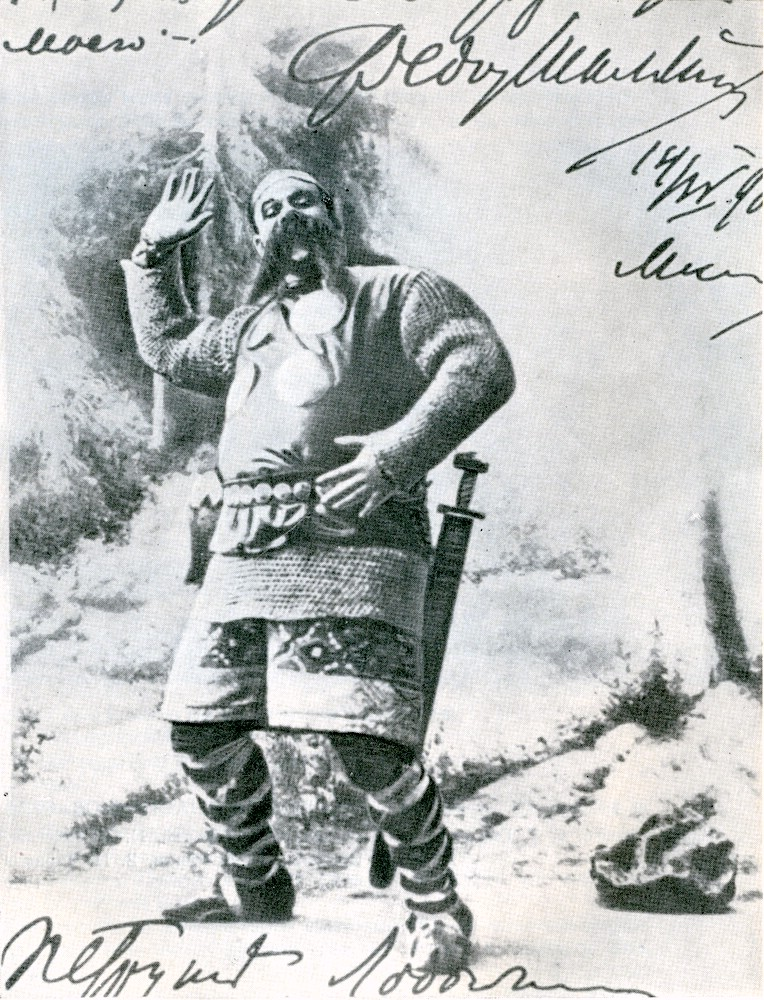
Fyodor Shalyapin as Farlaf (1901)

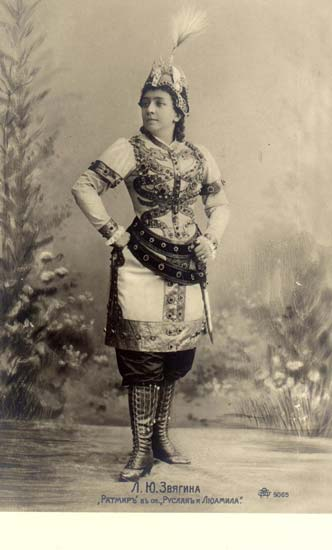
Lidiya Zvyagina as Ratmir (1900s)

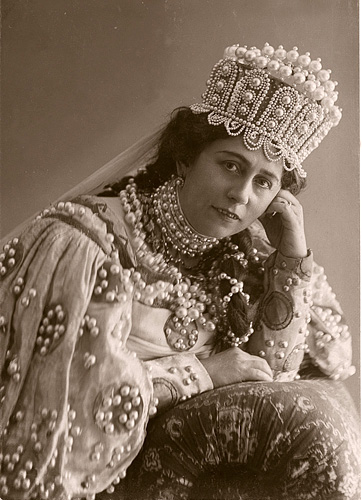
Antonina Nezhdanova as Lyudmila (1911)

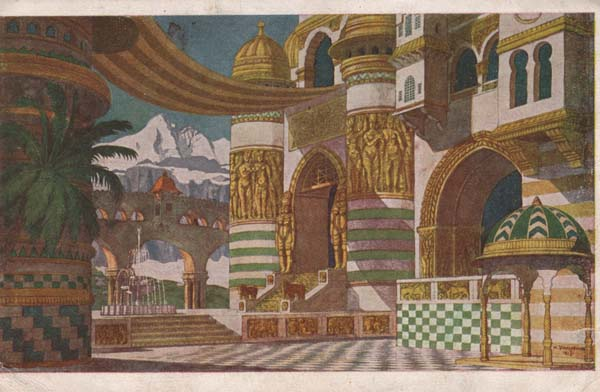
1905 set design for the opera by Ivan Bilibin

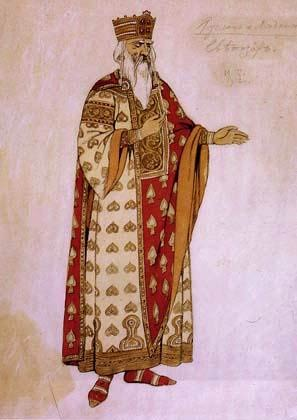
1905 costume design by Bilibin

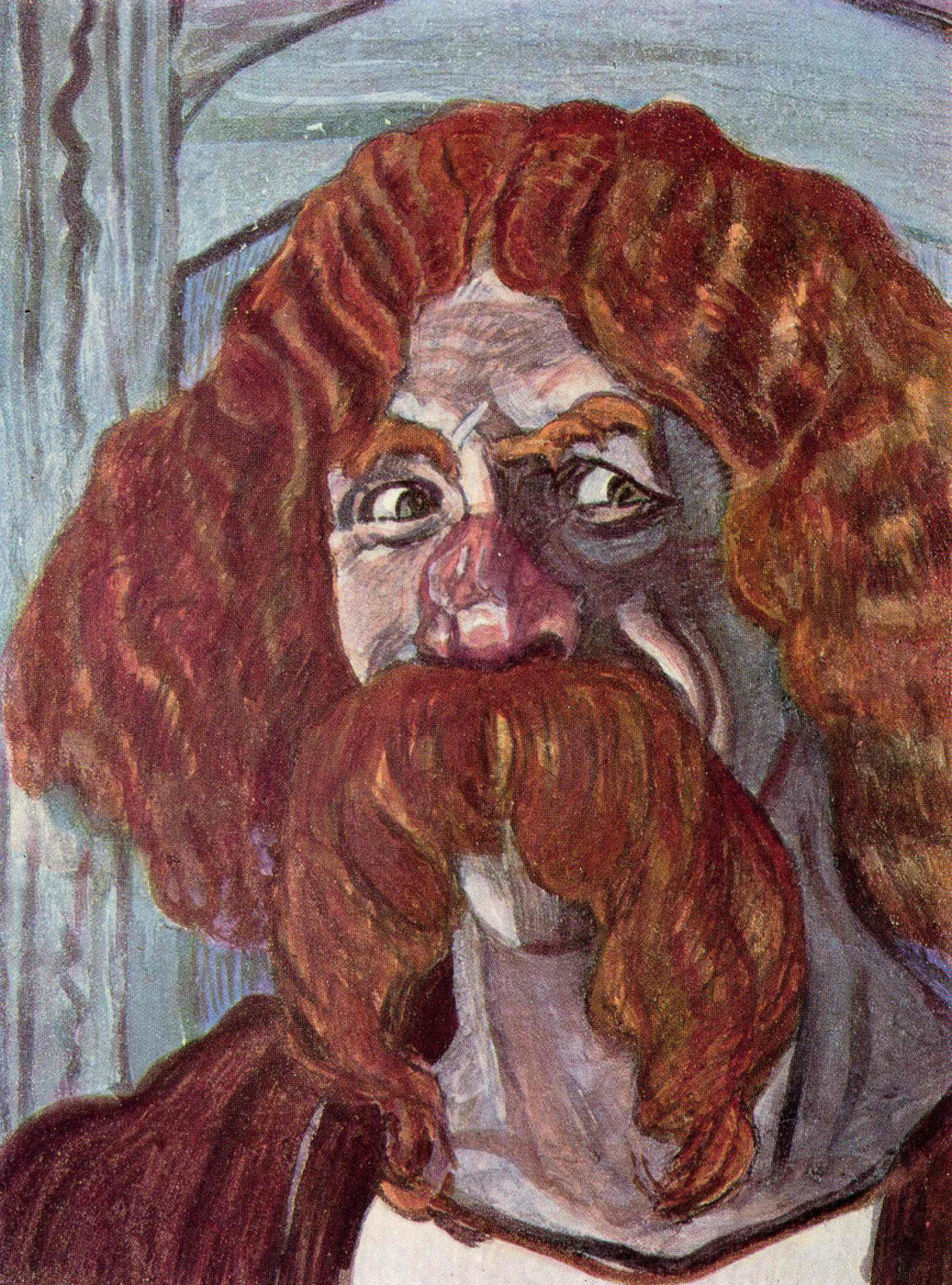
Chaliapin as Farlaf, by Alexander Golovin

== Roles ==
Roles, voice types, premiere casts for Saint Petersburg and Moscow
Role	Voice type	Saint Petersburg premiere, 27 November^{(Old Style)} 1842 Conductor: Karl Albrecht	Moscow premiere, 1846 Conductor: Ivan Iogannis
Svetozar, Great Prince of Kiev	bass	Sergey Baykov	
Lyudmila, his daughter	soprano	Mariya Stepanova	Mariya Stepanova
Ruslan, a Kievan knight, Lyudmila's betrothed	bass	Osip Petrov	Semen Hulak-Artemovsky
Ratmir, a Khazar prince	contralto	Anfisa Petrova	Anna Petrova-Vorobyova
Farlaf, a Varangian knight	bass	Dominic Tozi	Osip Petrov
Gorislava, a captive of Ratmir	soprano	Emiliya Lileyeva	Emiliya Lileyeva
Finn, a good sorcerer	tenor	Lev Leonov	Lev Leonov
Naina, an evil sorceress	mezzo-soprano	Yelizaveta Rïkalova (Marcel)	
Bayan, a bard	tenor	N. Likhansky	
Chorus, silent roles: the evil sorcerer Chernomor, the Head, Sons of Svetozar, knights, boyars and boyarynyas, chamber-maids and nurse-maids, page boys, bodyguards, cupbearers, stolniks, the Prince's armed force, people, maids of the magic castle, blackamoors, dwarves, slaves of Chernomor, nymphs, water nymphs

== Instrumentation ==
The work is scored for double woodwinds (and piccolo and contrabassoon), four horns, two trumpets, three trombones (alto, tenor and bass), timpani, snare drum, bass drum, cymbals, tambourine, triangle, offstage tam-tam, glockenspiel, piano, harp, glass harmonica, and strings.

== Synopsis ==
Time: The time of Kievan Rus' (9th to 13th centuries)
Place: Kiev; various imaginary and fantastic locations

=== Act 1 ===
In Svetozar's banquet hall, the wedding feast for Ruslan and Lyudmila is taking place. The guests listen to Bayan sing a song foretelling misfortune for the bride and groom, followed by happiness from true love. Lyudmila, saddened by the prospect of leaving her father, offers words of comfort to her unsuccessful suitors, Farlaf and Ratmir, and then pledges herself to Ruslan. Svetozar blesses the couple. All of a sudden everything goes dark and there is a crash of thunder. The people are paralysed by a spell while two monsters carry Lyudmila away. When light returns and everyone recovers, they panic over Lyudmila's disappearance. Svetozar promises half his kingdom and Lyudmila's hand to the man who brings her back. The three suitors ready themselves for the journey to find Lyudmila.

=== Act 2 ===
Tableau 1

Ruslan comes upon the cave of the kindly wizard Finn, who tells him that the evil sorcerer Chernomor has absconded with Lyudmila and that Ruslan is the man who will destroy him. Ruslan asks Finn why he lives in this deserted place, and Finn relates the story of many years ago, when he was a shepherd in his distant homeland (he says he is "a Finn") and fell in love with a beautiful girl named Naina. When she rejected his declaration of love, he went off to do battle with enemies for booty. Returning with this booty, he presented it to Naina, but she yet again spurned him. Then he resolved to study magic to win her; many years went by, and through sorcery he finally summoned an old, grey-haired, humpbacked woman – it was Naina, who now was mad with passion for him. He ran away from her and has been hiding from her ever since. For his abandoning her, Naina is consumed by vengeful hatred, which will likewise fall upon Ruslan. Assuring him that Lyudmila will not be harmed, Finn instructs Ruslan to head north, and the two of them exit in opposite directions.

Tableau 2

In a deserted place, the cowardly Farlaf wonders whether he should continue searching for Lyudmila, when the decrepit Naina approaches him. She promises to get Lyudmila for him and send Ruslan far away. She disappears, and Farlaf rejoices in his triumph.

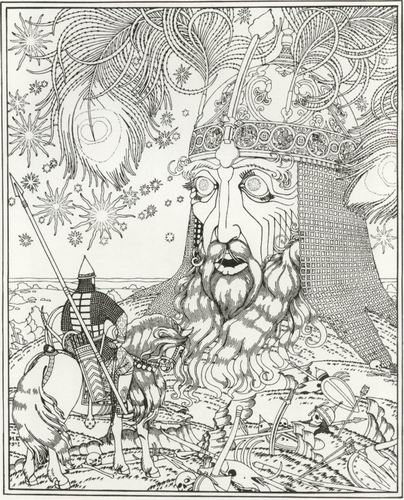
Ruslan Meeting the Talking Head, by Ivan Bilibin

Tableau 3

Ruslan, having come upon a foggy desert strewn with weapons and bones from a past battle, wonders at the cause of this scene and whether he, too, may end up the same way. He chooses a new shield and spear from the ground to replace his broken weaponry, but cannot find a sword heavy enough to complete his new set of armor. When the fog lifts, a giant Head is revealed and blows through its lips to bring up a storm so as to drive Ruslan away. When Ruslan strikes the head with his spear, the Head falls back and reveals a sword underneath. He takes it and asks the Head whence it came. As it is dying, the Head explains that it once was a giant, and his dwarf brother is the evil sorcerer Chernomor. The sword was destined to kill both of them; so, in order to forestall fate, Chernomor tricked the giant, beheaded him, and flew his live head away to the distant desert to keep the sword protected underneath it. With the sword now in Ruslan's hands, the Head calls for vengeance on Chernomor.

=== Act 3 ===
Young maidens are luring passing travelers to enter Naina's magical castle. Gorislava appears, looking for Ratmir, who had taken her captive and then abandoned her. After she goes away for a moment, Ratmir himself comes on the scene and falls under the spell of the maidens, who seduce him with dance. The final guest attracted to the castle is Ruslan, who finds himself forgetting Lyudmila upon seeing Gorislava. Suddenly Finn appears; and, after pronouncing a happy fate for Ratmir with Gorislava, and for Ruslan with Lyudmila, the castle turns into a forest as they resolve to rescue Lyudmila.

=== Act 4 ===
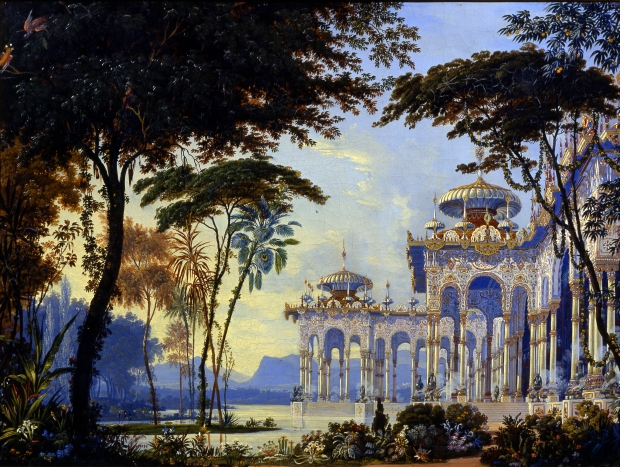
The Gardens of Chernomor, by Andreas Roller (1842)

Within Chernomor's magical gardens, Lyudmila longs for Ruslan and resists the influence of the enchanted surroundings. Chernomor with his retinue arrives; dances are performed. A trumpet call signals a challenge from Ruslan. Chernomor puts Lyudmila under a sleeping spell and goes off to fight Ruslan, who shortly comes on the scene triumphantly wearing Chernomor's beard around his helmet. Although he is disheartened by Lyudmila's condition, Ruslan, along with Ratmir and Gorislava, resolve to return to Kiev with Lyudmila to seek the aid of the magicians there. Chernomor's former slaves freely come along.

=== Act 5 ===
Tableau 1

In a moonlit valley, Ruslan, Ratmir, and Gorislava, with Lyudmila, have camped for the night. Ratmir, who is standing guard, worries about Ruslan, and then expresses his happiness at his reunion with Gorislava. Suddenly the slaves report that Lyudmila once again has been abducted and that Ruslan has left in search of her. Finn appears, gives a magic ring to Ratmir that will awaken Lyudmila when she is brought back to Kiev.

Tableau 2

Lyudmila lies asleep in Svetozar's banquet hall. It turns out that Farlaf, with Naina's assistance, kidnapped Lyudmila and brought her to Kiev so as to appear to have been her rescuer. However, he cannot waken her. Horses approach, and Ruslan, Ratmir, and Gorislava arrive. Ruslan brings the magic ring to Lyudmila, and she awakens. As the tableau opens onto a view of Kiev, the people rejoice in their gods, their motherland, and the young couple.

== Principal arias and numbers ==
Overture
Act 1

Aria: Cavatina "I'm sad, dear father!", Каватина «Грустно мне, родитель дорогой!» (Lyudmila)

Act 2

Aria: Ballad "Welcome, my son", Баллада «Добро пожаловать, мой сын» (Finn, Ruslan)
Aria: Rondo "The hour of my triumph is near", Рондо «Близок уж час торжества моего» (Farlaf)
Aria: "O field, field, who has strewn you with dead men's bones", «О поле, поле, кто тебя усеял мертвыми костями» (Ruslan)

Act 3

Aria: "Night shadow's followed the ardent heat", «И жар и зной сменила ночи тень» (Ratmir)
Dances

Act 4

Aria: Aria (Lyudmila)
March: Chernomor's March, «Марш Черномора» (orchestra)
Oriental Dances, «Восточные танцы» (orchestra)
1. Turkish Dance, «турецкий танец»
2. Arabian Dance, «арабский танец»
3. Lezginka, «лезгинка»

== Structure ==
Overture

Act 1

No. 1: Introduction
No. 2: Cavatina (Lyudmila)
No. 3: Finale

Act 2

No. 4: Entr'acte
No. 5: Ballad (Finn)
No. 6: Duettino (Ruslan, Finn)
No. 7: Scene and Rondo (Farlaf)
No. 8: Aria (Ruslan)
No. 9: Scene with the Head
No. 10: Finale – Tale of the Head

Act 3

No. 11: Entr'acte
No. 12: Persian Chorus
No. 13: Cavatina (Gorislava)
No. 14: Aria (Ratmir)
No. 15: Dances
- Allegro moderato
- Adagio
- Grazioso
- Coda
No. 16: Finale

Act 4

No. 17: Entr'acte
No. 18: Scene and Aria (Lyudmila)
No. 19: March of Chernomor
No. 20: Oriental Dances
No. 21: Chorus
No. 22: Finale

Act 5

No. 23: Entr'acte
No. 24: Romance (Ratmir)
No. 25: Recitative and Chorus
No. 26: Duet (Finn, Ratmir)
No. 27: Finale

== Analysis ==
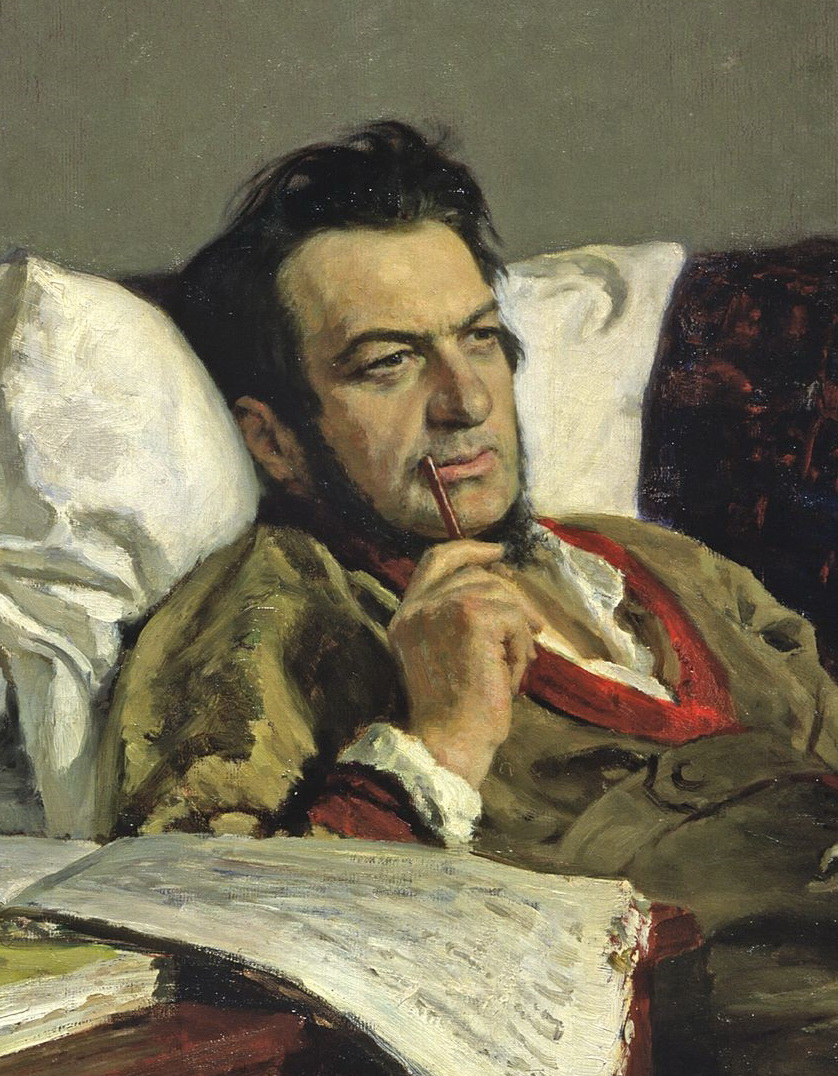
Glinka composing Ruslan and Lyudmila, by Ilya Repin

As with A Life for the Tsar, Ruslan employs some aspects of Russian folk music; it is also noted for imaginative use of dissonance, chromaticism, and Eastern elements. Of particular consequence is the use of the whole tone scale for the first time in Russian music. It is particularly associated thematically with Chernomor and, as a result, became so popular among Russian composers for suggesting evil or ominous personages or situations, that even today Russian musicians refer to the whole tone scale as gamma Chernomora, or "Chernomor's scale".

The rollicking overture is one of the best known orchestral showpieces in the West and known for being a nightmare for bassists. An orchestral feature of act 1 is the use of piano and harp to suggest the timbre of the gusli. Glinka's debt to Western operatic models is abundantly apparent in Farlaf's Rondo, a Russian emulation of Figaro's "Largo al factotum" from Rossini's The Barber of Seville.

Glinka's variation treatment of folk melody crystallized in Ruslan into what has been called his influential "changing background technique", used, for example, in Finn's ballad and the Head's narrative, but seen to best advantage in the Persian Chorus that opens act 3, where the tune remains intact through five statements while the orchestral background is changed completely on each repetition.

Along with its counterpart A Life for the Tsar, this second opera by Glinka confirmed a Russian national operatic foundation that was to be built upon by the next generation of Russian composers. In particular, Ruslan served as the model for Russian operatic fairy tales, particularly those of Nikolai Rimsky-Korsakov.

== Recordings ==
- 1938: Samuil Samosud (conductor), Bolshoi Theatre Orchestra and Chorus, Maksim Mikhaylov (Svetozar), Valeria Barsova (Lyudmila), Mark Reizen (Ruslan), Yelizaveta Antonova (Ratmir), Vasiliy Lubenchov (Farlaf), Yelena Slivinskaya (Gorislava), Nikander Khanayev (Finn), Lyudmila Stavrovskaya (Naina), Solomon Khromchenko (Bayan). Melodiya
- 1952: Kirill Kondrashin (conductor), Bolshoi Theatre Orchestra and Chorus, Vladimir Gavriushov (Svetozar), Vera Firsova (Lyudmila), Ivan Petrov (Ruslan), Eugenia Verbitskaya (Ratmir), Alexei Krivchenya (Farlaf), Nina Pokrovskaya (Gorislava), Georgi Nelepp (Finn), Elena Korneyeva (Naina), Sergei Lemeshev (Bayan). Melodiya
- 1979: Yuri Simonov (conductor), Bolshoi Theatre Orchestra and Chorus, Valeri Yaroslavtsev (Svetozar), Bela Rudenko (Lyudmila), Evgeny Nesterenko (Ruslan), Tamara Sinyavskaya (Ratmir), Boris Morozov (Farlaf), Nina Fomina (Gorislava), Aleksei Maslennikov (Finn), Galina Borisova (Naina), Alexander Arkhipov (Bayan). Melodiya
- 1995: (DVD) Valery Gergiev (conductor), Kirov Orchestra, Opera Chorus and Ballet, St. Petersburg, in association with San Francisco Opera, Mikhail Kit (Svetozar), Anna Netrebko (Lyudmila), Vladimir Ognovenko (Ruslan), Larissa Diadkova (Ratmir), Gennady Bezzubenkov (Farlaf), Galina Gorchakova (Gorislava), Konstantin Pluzhnikov (Finn), Irena Bogachova (Naina), Yuri Marusin (Bayan). Philips / Decca
- 2003: Alexander Vedernikov, Bolshoi Theatre Orchestra and Chorus, Vadim Lynkovsky (Svetozar), Ekaterina Morosova (Lyudmila), Taras Shtonda (Ruslan), Alexandra Dursseneva (Ratmir), Valery Gilmanov (Farlaf), Maria Gavrilova (Gorislava), Vitaly Panfilov (Finn), Irina Dolyenko (Naina), Maksim Paster (Bayan). Pentatone
- 2011: (DVD) Vladimir Jurowski (conductor), Orchestra and Choir of the Bolshoi Theatre, Albina Shagimuratova (Lyudmila), Mikhail Petrenko (Ruslan), Yuriy Mynenko (Ratmir), Almas Svilpa (Farlaf), Alexandrina Pendatchanska (Gorislava), Charles Workman (Finn/Bayan), Vladimir Ognovenko (Svetozar), Elena Zaremba (Naina). Belair classiques

== In popular culture ==
The 1992 video game Tetris Classic, which features artwork depicting scenes from the story, incorporates the opera's overture as its title theme, and arranged selections of the opera are featured throughout the game. The overture was also used as the theme tune for the TV series Mom, the children's TV series Oscar's Orchestra, and the BBC Radio 4 sitcom Cabin Pressure.
