= Andreas Roller =

German painter (1805–1891)

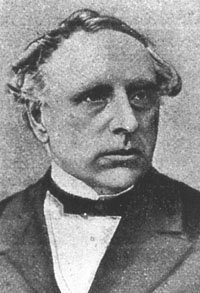
Andreas Roller (date unknown)

Andreas Leonhard Roller (Russian: Андреас Леонгард Роллер, also known as "Андрей Адамович Роллер"; 8 January 1805, Regensburg – 20 June 1891, St. Petersburg) was a German-born Russian landscape painter and theatrical set designer, who served as a Professor at the Imperial Academy of Arts.

== Biography ==
His father was a theatre mechanic, and his uncle was a concertmaster. All of his siblings became involved in the theatre in some creative capacity. At the age of five, his family moved to Vienna, where he later studied at the Academy of Fine Arts. Before and during that time, he also studied the construction of theatrical machinery with his father, and set painting with Antonio de Pian.

He began working as a decorator and engineering assistant to his father in 1821. The following year, he became Chief Engineer at the Theater in der Josefstadt. After leaving that post, around 1830, he worked at theatres throughout Germany and Austria; he also traveled to England, Scotland, and France. While in Berlin, he worked with the architect and designer Karl Friedrich Schinkel, who had a lasting influence on his work.

In 1833, Roller was invited to St. Petersburg to become a decorator and Chief Engineer for the Imperial Theatres. He held this position until 1879, when illness forced him to resign. During those years, he designed some of the most significant productions in his adopted country, including the premier of A Life for the Tsar, by Mikhail Glinka, one of the first Russian operas, at the Imperial Bolshoi Kamenny Theatre. His technical contributions included the introduction of moving scenery and the so-called "ruin effect", where the stage set appears to collapse. In 1862, he created a version of La Forza del Destino, by Verdi, with thunder and the illusion of rain.

He was eventually involved in over 200 plays, operas and ballets, as well as producing over a thousand tableaux vivants. He also painted curtains and created a panorama of the city of Palermo, which was displayed near the Mikhailovsky Manezh, but was destroyed by fire a mere two years later, in 1852. Several reconstruction projects made use of his expertise; notably those at the Winter Palace (1836) and the Hermitage (1856). That same year, he was named a Professor of perspective at the Imperial Academy. He became a Russian citizen in 1873.

== Selected works ==
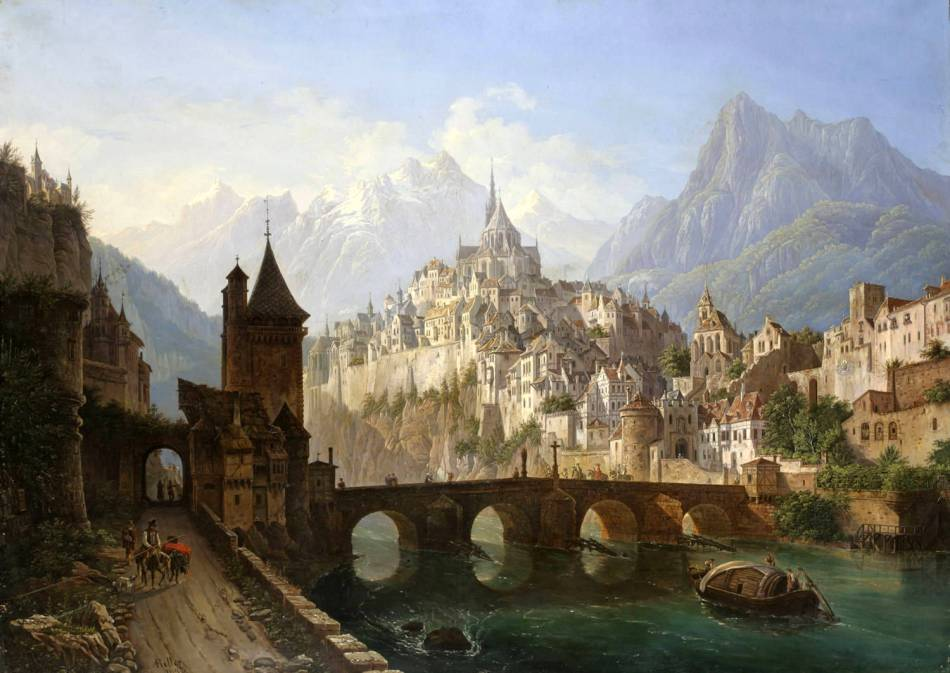
Landscape with Castle

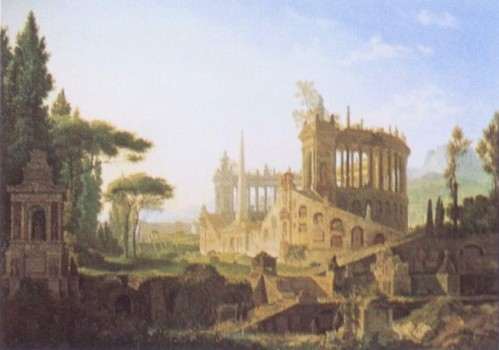
Landscape with Roman Cemetery

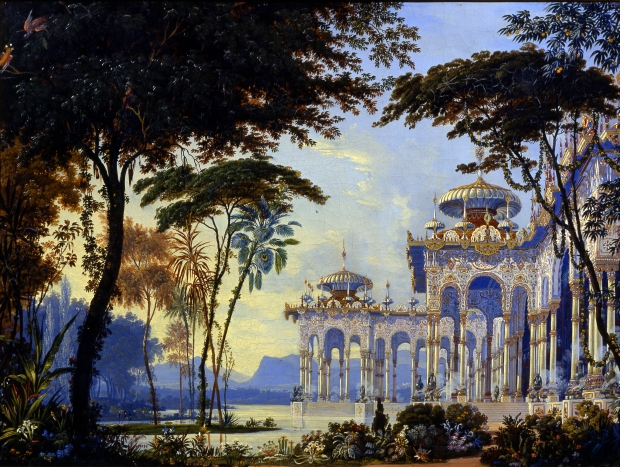
"The Gardens of Chernomor"
Stage setting for Ruslan and Ludmila

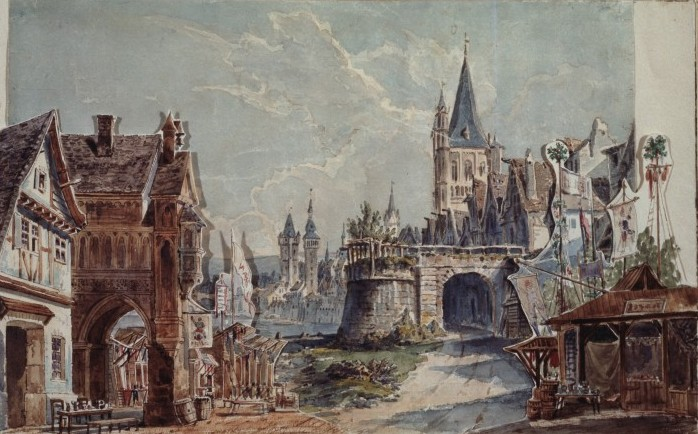
Stage setting for Faust, the ballet

== Sources ==
- "Роллер, Андреас Леонгард" . Brockhaus and Efron Encyclopedic Dictionary (in Russian). 1906.
