= Celilo Converter Station =

AC-DC power conversion station near The Dalles, Oregon

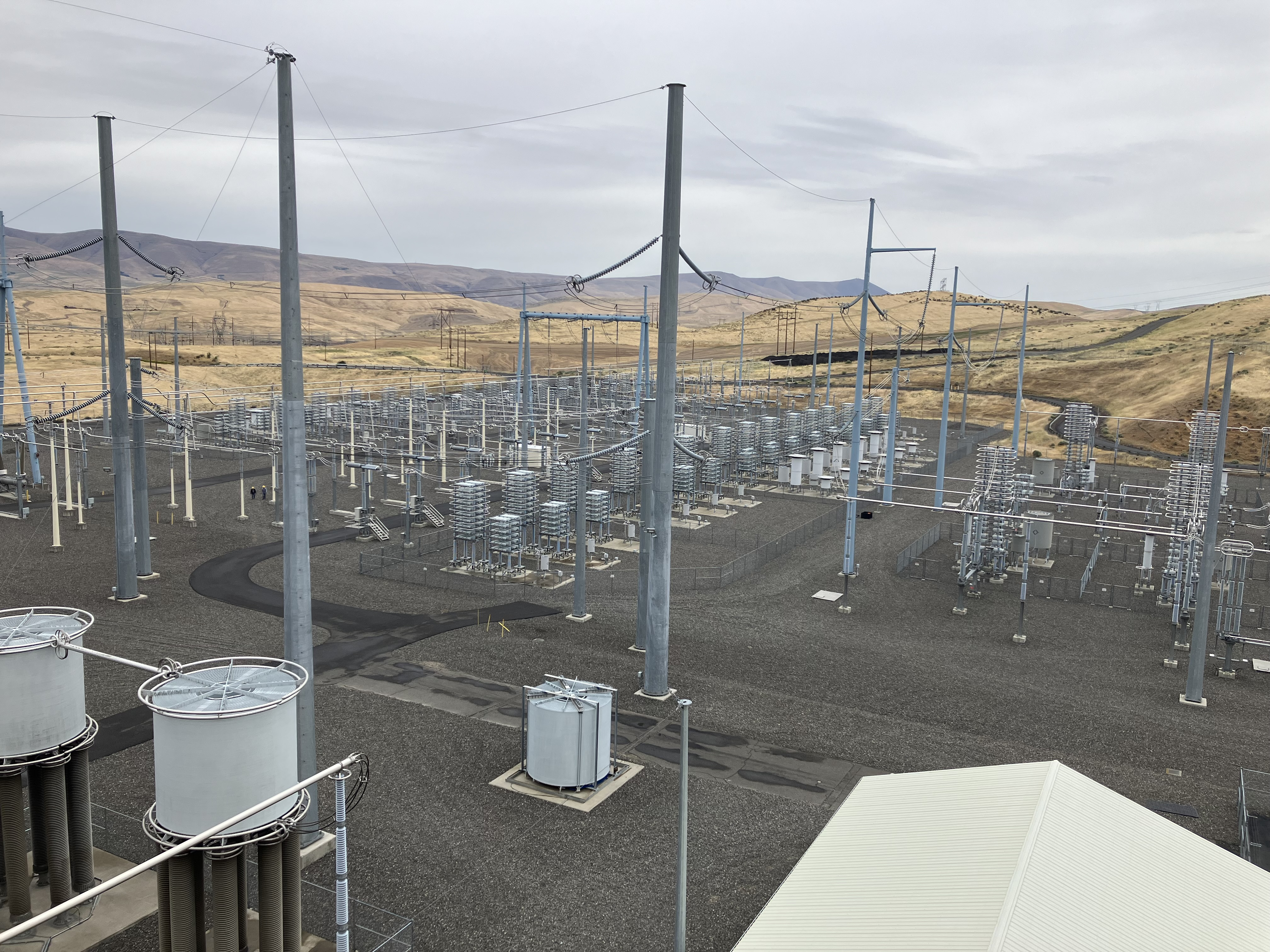
The Celilo Converter Station in 2026

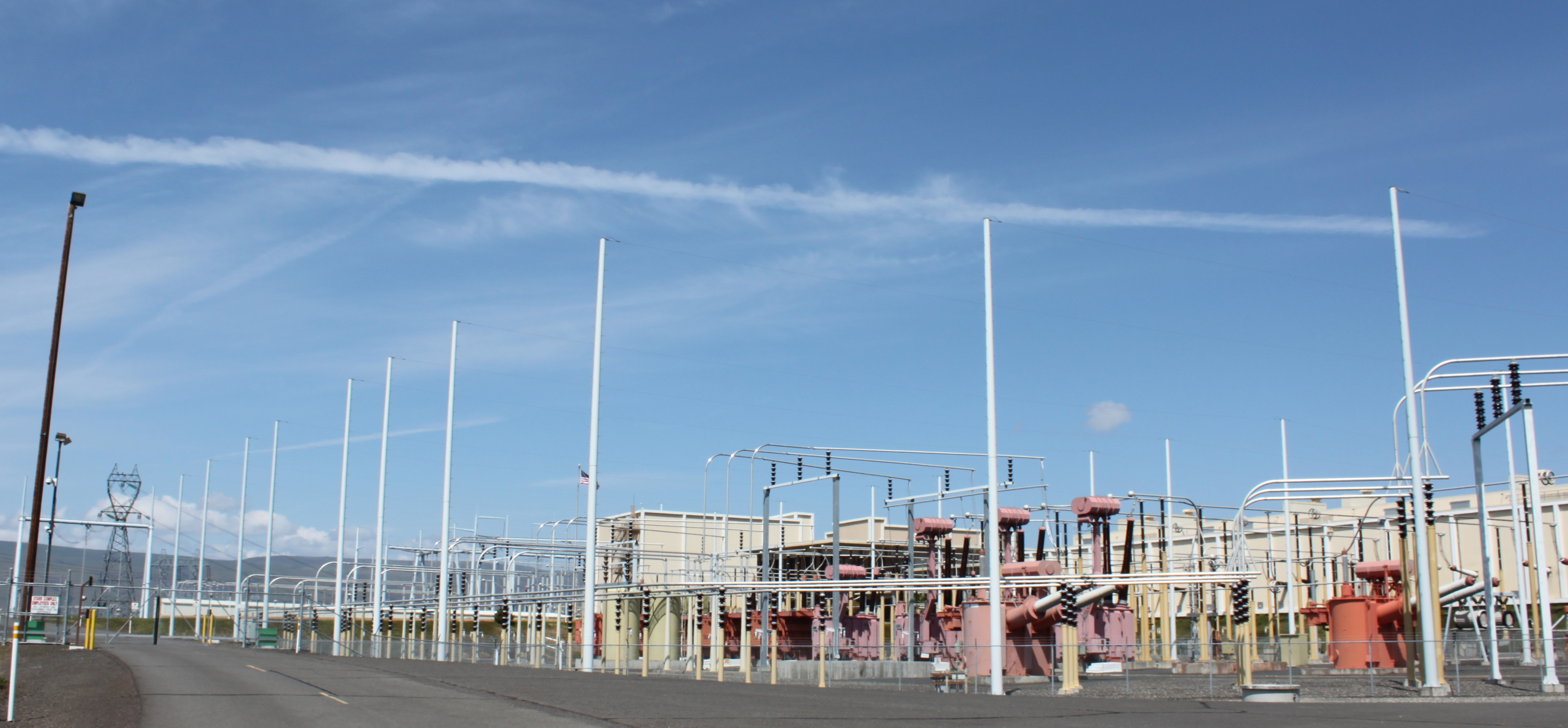
The Celilo Converter Station in 2009

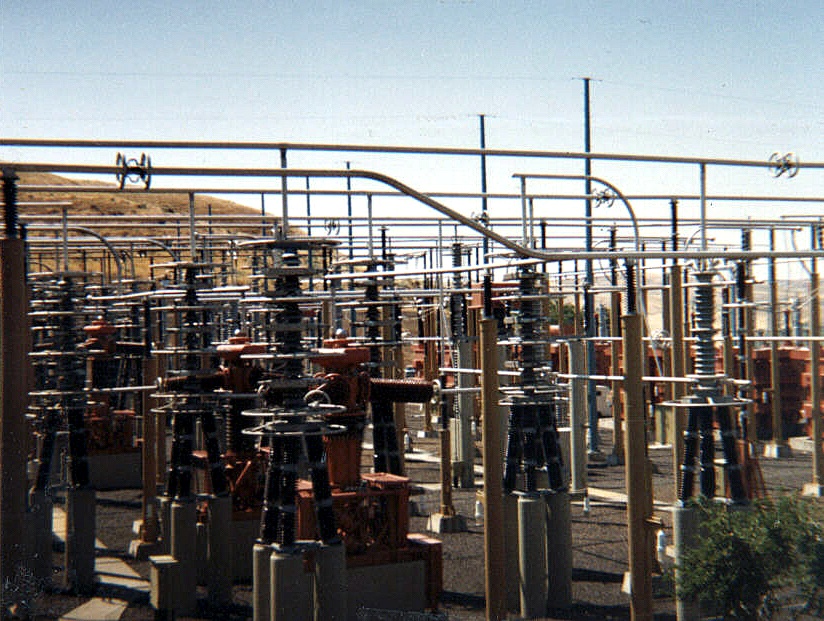
The Celilo Converter Station in 1989

The Celilo Converter Station, built in 1970 and owned and operated by the Bonneville Power Administration, is the northern terminus of the Pacific DC Intertie, near The Dalles, Oregon, in the United States.

== History ==
The Celilo Converter Station was originally configured with six groups of six-pulse mercury arc valves with a blocking voltage of 133 kV each (for a total of ±400 kV) and a maximum current of 2,000 amperes.

1985
Two six-pulse valve groups of thyristors were added in 1985, to increase the voltage to 500 kV per pole for a total differential voltage of 1,000 kV.

1989
Two new 1,100 ampere, 500 kV thyristor converters were added, in 1989, in parallel with the two existing converters, giving a total transmission power of 3,100 Megawatts (3,100 A at ±500 kV).

For this extension a new converter hall was built at the southern side of the station at 45.593816°N 121.112490°W.

2001
Security concerns in the aftermath of the September 11, 2001 attacks on the U.S. led to the Celilo Converter Station closing to the general public. It previously had included informative displays describing the history of DC transmission and the Pacific Intertie.

2004
The mercury arc valve groups were all replaced in 2004 with light-triggered thyristor groups, to eliminate the environmental risks of mercury and to reduce the maintenance costs of the obsolete mercury arc valves.

2016
The new Celilo Converter Station went into service in January 2016 after the entire terminal had been replaced with a new two-converter terminal rated ±560 kV 3410 A (3800 MW), while the Oregon section of the transmission line was upgraded to ±520 kV and 3,220 MW.

== Related structures ==
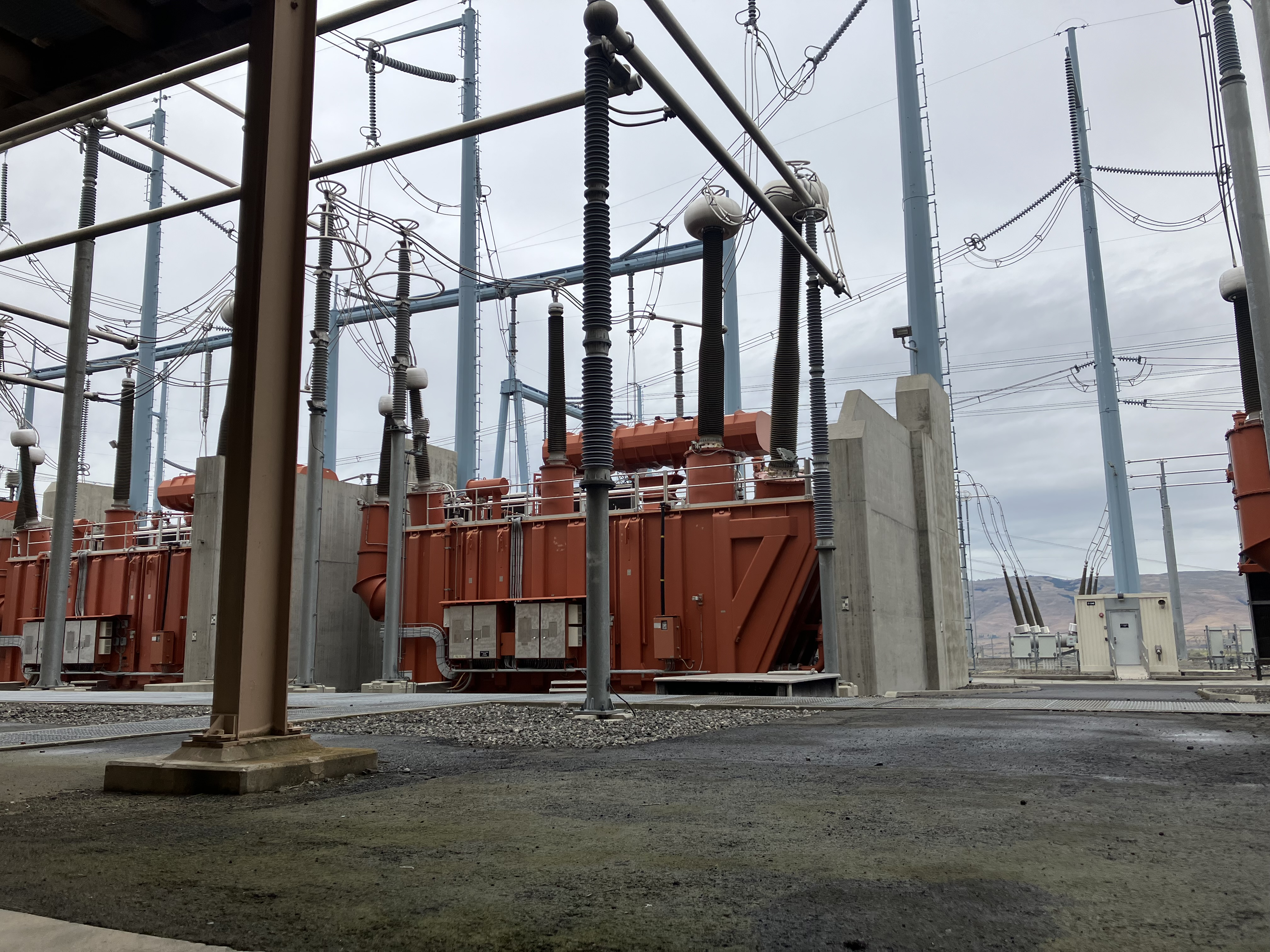
Transformers at Celilo Converter Station

There was also a DC test facility for testing high voltage equipment nearby (now abandoned, soon to be demolished). At the end of the 1960s, a test transmission line for 1,333 kV was erected at 45.482792°N 120.814097°W. The facility was built to test the high voltage DC equipment intended for a planned connection between Celilo Converter Station and Hoover Dam that never was built.

== See also ==
- Sylmar Converter Station
- Pacific DC Intertie
