= Maria Teresa Correia de Barros =

Portuguese electrical engineer

Maria Teresa Nunes Padilha de Castro Correia de Barros is a Portuguese electrical engineer whose interests include high voltage engineering, quality engineering of electrical power systems, and transients in power systems. She is a professor at the Instituto Superior Técnico, the engineering school of the University of Lisbon.

== Education and career ==
Correia de Barros earned a degree in electrical engineering through the Instituto Superior Técnico in 1974, completed a doctorate there in 1985, and earned her habilitation (Agregado) in 1995.

At the Instituto Superior Técnico, she became head of the Power Systems Division from 1989 to 1991, and from 1990 to 2001 she was president and then head of the executive board of the Instituto da Energia (INTERG). She also headed the Energy Commission of the Portuguese National Research Agency from 1991 to 1994. She became pro-rector of the Technical University of Lisbon from 1999 to 2001. From 2001 to 2009 she worked for Energias de Portugal, and from 2004 to 2007 she was president of the National Electrical Engineering Council of Ordem dos Engenheiros, the Portuguese National Engineers Association. She has also held many visiting positions at international institutions.

She was the founder, in 1993, of the biennial International Conference on Power Systems Transients.

== Recognition ==
Ward was named a Fellow of the IEEE in 2000, "for contribution to modeling and analysis of power systems transients". She became a Fellow (Membro Conselheiro) of Ordem dos Engenheiros in 2002, was given a Technical Council Award for System Technical Performance by the International Council on Large Electric Systems (CIGRE) in 2008, and is the 2014 winner of the Scientific Committee Award of the International Conference on Lightning Protection.
