= Carl Albrecht =

Charles, Karl or Carl Albrecht may refer to:

== Entrepreneurs ==
- Carl Albrecht (businessman) (1875–1952), German cotton merchant
- Karl Albrecht (1920–2014), German founder of supermarket chain Aldi
- Karl Albrecht Jr. (born 1948), German billionaire; son of Karl Albrecht

== Musicians ==
- Karl Franzevich Albrecht (1807–1863), German-Russian musician and composer
- Charles Albrecht (1817–1895), Monegasque composer

== Nobles ==
- Karl Albrecht, Elector of Bavaria (1697–1745), Elector from 1726 and Charles VII, Holy Roman Emperor from 1742
- Karl Albrecht I, Prince of Hohenlohe-Waldenburg-Schillingsfürst (1719–1793), ruler of German principality Hohenlohe-Waldenburg-Schillingsfürst; a/k/a Charles Albert
- Karl Albrecht II, Prince of Hohenlohe-Waldenburg-Schillingsfürst (1742–1796), ruler of German principality Hohenlohe-Waldenburg-Schillingsfürst; a/k/a Charles Albert
- Karl Albrecht III, Prince of Hohenlohe-Waldenburg-Schillingsfürst (1776–1843), ruler of German principality Hohenlohe-Waldenburg-Schillingsfürst; a/k/a Charles Albert
- Archduke Karl Albrecht of Austria (1888–1951), Austrian-Polish landowner

== Others ==
- Carl Theodor Albrecht (1843–1915), German astronomer
- Carl Albrecht (before 1870—after 1898), German-American journalist (Anzeiger des Westens#Later years)
- Charles Albrecht (before 1875—after 1893), German cycling champion (UCI Motor-paced World Championships)
- Carl Albrecht (psychologist) (1902–1965), German psychotherapist and physician
- Carl Albrecht (politician) (born 1952), American politician from Utah
- Karl Franz Georg Albrecht (1799–1873), Hanoverian lawyer and civil servant

== See also ==
- Carl Albert (1908–2000), American politician
- Carl Albert (musician) (1962–1995), American rock singer
- Karl Albert (1921–2008), German philosopher
- Charles Albert of Sardinia (1798–1849), King of Sardinia; a/k/a Carlo Alberto di Savoia
- Carlo Alberto (disambiguation)
