= Carlos Alberto Taylhardat =

Venezuelan naval captain and diplomat

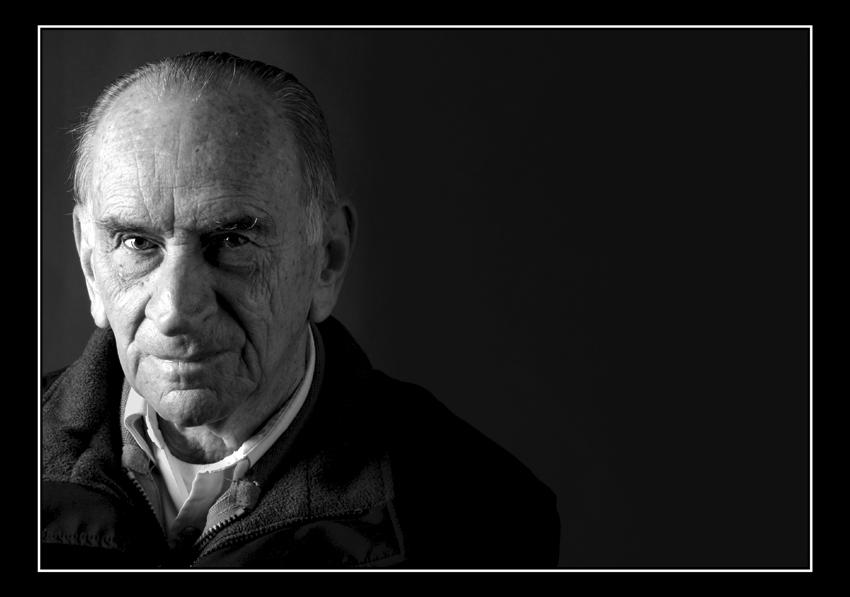
- Born: June 6, 1921; Maracay, Venezuela
- Died: November 21, 2011 (aged 90); Caracas, Venezuela
- Occupation(s): Naval officer and diplomat

Carlos Alberto Taylhardat (Maracay, June 6, 1921 – Caracas, November 21, 2011) was a Venezuelan naval captain and diplomat. He was the son of Carlos Albert Taylhardat a Venezuelan lawyer. He trained in military school in Italy, until 1942. He was a naval captain in Venezuela for 30 years, and the ambassador of Venezuela to Beirut, Lebanon, and Baghdad, Iraq, in 1990 to 1994.

== Cuban revolution ==
Taylhardat helped Fidel Castro in 1958 by buying World War II weapons from the United States, to later deliver, via the Venezuelan government, to Castro's revolution in the Sierra Maestra.

== References in print ==
BARRETO, Braulio. Bajo el terror de la SN (1984)

COLECTIVO. La violencia en la Venezuela reciente, 1958–1980. Volumen 3 (1992)

COLECTIVO. El 23 de enero y las Fuerzas Armadas Venezolanas (Ministeio de Defensa (Venezuela, 1990)

COLECTIVO. Gobierno y época de la junta revolucionaria (Congreso de la República. (Caracas, 1990)

GARCÍA PONCE, Guillermo. La fuga del cuartel San Carlos (1991)

MALDONADO, Jorge. Génesis y consecuencias del 23 de enero de 1958 (1984)

PÉREZ LECUNA, Roberto. Apuntes para la historia militar de Venezuela (1999)

RAMÍREZ, Edito. Memorias de un inconforme

RIVAS RIVAS, José. Historia gráfica de Venezuela: El gobierno de Rómulo Betancourt (1972)

SUAREZ PEREZ, Eugenio (y otros). Fidel: de Cinco Palmas a Santiago (2006)

YANES, Oscar. Hoy es mañana, o, Las vainas de un reportero muerto (1994)

TAYLHARDAT, Carlos Alberto. La Infantería de Marina en combate (Revista Militar, v.51; Buenos Aires, 1951)
