= Carlos Madeo =

Argentine footballer

Carlos Alberto Madeo (born 31 July 1981 in Buenos Aires, Argentina) is an Argentine footballer who plays as a defender for Deportivo Laferrere.

== Teams ==
- (Argentina) 1999-2005 Deportivo Morón 177 appearances | 11 goals
- (Paraguay) 2005-2006 Club Olimpia 13 appearances
- (Argentina) 2006 Deportivo Morón 1 appearance
- (Argentina) 2007 El Porvenir 15 appearances | 1 goal
- (Argentina) 2007-2011 All Boys 71 appearances | 4 goals
- (Argentina) 2011-2012 Barracas Central
- (Argentina) 2012-2013 Juventud Unida Universitario
- (Venezuela) 2013 Aragua FC
- (Argentina) 2013-2015 Defensores Unidos
- (Argentina) 2015- Deportivo Laferrere
