= Carlos Alberto Seguín =

Peruvian physician

Carlos Alberto Seguín (1907–1995) was a Peruvian physician.
