= Carlos Sánchez (footballer, born 1980) =

Mexican footballer

Carlos Alberto Sánchez
Personal information
- Full name: Carlos Alberto Sánchez Romero
- Date of birth: 13 February 1980 (age 46)
- Place of birth: Mexico City, Mexico
- Height: 1.79 m (5 ft 10 in)
- Position: Centre-back

Senior career*
Years	Team	Apps	(Gls)
2002–2005	Club América	28	(0)
2005–2008	San Luis F.C.	31	(0)
2008	Club América	13	(0)
- * Club domestic league appearances and goals as of June 4, 2008

Carlos Alberto Sánchez Romero (born 13 February 1980) is a Mexican former footballer who played as a defender.

== Career ==
Sánchez began playing football with the local Club América. He spent several seasons with San Luis F.C. before returning to América in 2008. On 12 August 2008 he suffered before beginning practice a major stroke caused by a blood clot. He was released from the hospital and his condition has improved; he has been moved to physical therapy—his football career is over.
