= Carlos Alberto Palacio =

Colombian footballer (born 1988)

Personal information
- Full name: Carlos Alberto Palacio Quiñonez
- Date of birth: 5 February 1988 (age 38)
- Place of birth: Bogotá, Colombia
- Height: 1.80 m (5 ft 11 in)
- Position: Midfielder

Team information
- Current team: Fortaleza

Senior career*
Years	Team	Apps	(Gls)
2006–2007	Millonarios	23	(0)
2008	→ Deportivo Pereira (loan)	3	(0)
2009–2010	Cerro Largo	17	(0)
2010	Durazno	4	(0)
2011–	Fortaleza	16	(0)
- * Club domestic league appearances and goals as of 04:11, 25 March 2009 (UTC)

Carlos Alberto Palacio (born February 5, 1988, in Bogotá, Cundinamarca) is a Colombian football midfielder, who currently plays for Fortaleza F.C. in the Categoría Primera B.

== See also ==
- Football in Colombia
- List of football clubs in Colombia
