= Carlos Rodríguez (Argentine footballer) =

Argentine footballer

Personal information
- Full name: Carlos Alberto Miguel Rodríguez
- Date of birth: 1 November 1990 (age 36)
- Place of birth: San Salvador de Jujuy, Argentina
- Position: Midfielder

Senior career*
Years	Team	Apps	(Gls)
2009–2011	Gimnasia y Esgrima	1	(0)
2011–2012	Talleres	44	(0)
2013	River Plate		
2013–2014	Monterrico	13	(0)
2014–2015	Altos Hornos Zapla	38	(0)
2016	Deportivo Tabacal	13	(0)
- * Club domestic league appearances and goals

Carlos Alberto Miguel Rodríguez (born 1 November 1990) is an Argentine footballer who plays as a midfielder. He is currently a free agent.

== Career ==
Rodríguez's senior career began in 2009 with Primera B Nacional side Gimnasia y Esgrima. He made his professional debut on 19 September during a victory at home to San Martín, which preceded his departure from the club in June 2011. He subsequently joined Talleres of Torneo Argentino B, making forty-four appearances in just over a year with them. After Talleres, Rodríguez had spells with River Plate and Monterrico. In 2014, Rodríguez joined Altos Hornos Zapla in Torneo Federal A. Thirty-nine appearances across the 2014 and 2015 campaigns followed. 2016 saw Rodríguez make thirteen appearances for Deportivo Tabacal.

== Career statistics ==
As of 22 May 2018.

Club statistics
Club	Season	League			Cup (Note: Includes the Copa Argentina)		League Cup		Continental		Other		Total	
Club	Season	Division	Apps	Goals	Apps	Goals	Apps	Goals	Apps	Goals	Apps	Goals	Apps	Goals
Gimnasia y Esgrima	2009–10	Primera B Nacional	1	0	0	0	—		—		0	0	1	0
Gimnasia y Esgrima	2010–11	Primera B Nacional	0	0	0	0	—		—		0	0	0	0
Gimnasia y Esgrima	Total		1	0	0	0	—		—		0	0	1	0
Monterrico	2013–14	Torneo Argentino B	13	0	0	0	—		—		0	0	13	0
Altos Hornos Zapla	2014	Torneo Federal A	13	0	0	0	—		—		0	0	13	0
Altos Hornos Zapla	2015	Torneo Federal A	25	0	1	0	—		—		0	0	26	0
Altos Hornos Zapla	Total		38	0	1	0	—		—		0	0	39	0
Deportivo Tabacal	2016	Torneo Federal B	13	0	0	0	—		—		0	0	13	0
Career total			65	0	1	0	—		—		0	0	66	0
