= Carlos Alberto Pérez Cuevas =

Mexican politician

- Born: 24 March 1974 (age 52); Ciudad Nezahualcóyotl, State of Mexico, Mexico
- Occupation: Politician
- Political party: PAN

Carlos Alberto Pérez Cuevas (born 24 March 1974) is a Mexican politician from the National Action Party. From 2009 to 2012 he served as Deputy of the LXI Legislature of the Mexican Congress representing the State of Mexico.
