= Eumone Baratta =

Italian sculptor

Eumone Baratta (born c. 1823~After 1890) was an Italian sculptor.

He was born in Carrara, and began studies in his native city. There in 1847, he was awarded a two-year pension to study in Rome, from where he sent back to his home town three sculptures:

- Jesus at the Column
- A Mother's Education
- Huntress accompanying Diana

He participated in the defense of Rome against the French, and after the defeat of the Roman Republic, he remained in Rome and Florence. In 1858, he became professor of sculpture in the Accademia di Belle Arti of Carrara. He published a satirical comedy entitled Onestà e Valore, where he satirizes foreign sculptors and their methods. Among his works:

- Olindo and Sofronia condemned to be burned alive
- Jesus in his Tomb
- Love and Fidelity
- Jesus disputes the Doctors
- Bacchant
- Mansuetudine (first prize, Esposizione romana delle Opere d'Arte relative al culto cattolico, 1870).
