= Carlos Alberto Reis de Paula =

Afro-Brazilian judge

Carlos Alberto Reis de Paula (born February 26, 1944, in Pedro Leopoldo, Minas Gerais, Brazil) is the first Afro-Brazilian president of Brazilian Superior Labor Court (Tribunal Superior do Trabalho).
