= Electric Power Systems Research =

Scientic journal concerning electrical research

- Discipline: Electrical energy
- Language: English
- Edited by: Maria Teresa Correia de Barros

Publication details
- History: 1977–present
- Publisher: Elsevier
- Frequency: Monthly
- Open access: Hybrid
- Impact factor: 3.414 (2021)

Standard abbreviations
- ISO 4: Electr. Power Syst. Res.

Indexing
- CODEN: EPSRDN
- ISSN: 0378-7796 (print); 1873-2046 (web)
- LCCN: 79649596
- OCLC no.: 3700049

Links
- Journal homepage; Online archive

Electric Power Systems Research is a peer-reviewed scientific journal covering research on new applications of transmission, generation, distribution and uses of electric power. Its current editor-in-chief is Maria Teresa Correia de Barros. According to the Journal Citation Reports, the journal has a 2010 impact factor of 1.396.
