= China (footballer, born 1964) =

Brazilian footballer (born 1964)

Personal information
- Full name: Carlos Alberto Gomes Kao Yien
- Date of birth: 9 December 1964 (age 61)
- Place of birth: Vitória, Espírito Santo, Brazil
- Position: Right-back

Senior career*
Years	Team	Apps	(Gls)
1983–1984	Rio Branco	4	(0)
1985	→ Brasília (loan)	16	(3)
1985–1988	Rio Branco	16	(2)
1989	Inter de Limeira	17	(2)
1990–1991	Grêmio	23	(2)
1993	Botafogo	5	(0)
1994–1996	Linhares	0	(0)
1999	Avaí	0	(0)
Total		81	(9)

Managerial career
- 2010: Desportiva Ferroviária
- * Club domestic league appearances and goals

Carlos Alberto Gomes Kao Yien, commonly known as China (born 9 December 1964), is a Brazilian former professional footballer who played as a right-back for several Série A clubs.

== Career ==
Born in Vitória, China started his career in 1983 with Rio Branco, playing four Série A games and winning the Campeonato Capixaba before being loaned to Brasília in 1985. With Brasília he played 16 games and scored three goals. He returned to Rio Branco in 1985, winning the Campeonato Capixaba again, and playing 16 Série A games and scoring two goals before leaving the club in 1988. China joined Inter de Limeira in 1989, playing 17 Série A games and scoring two goals for the club. He played 23 Série A games and scored two goals for Grêmio between 1990 and 1991. With Botafogo, China played five Série A games in 1993, and was part of the squad that won that edition of the Copa CONMEBOL. He defended Linhares from 1994 to 1996, winning the Campeonato Capixaba in 1995, and Avaí in 1999, before retiring.

== Honors ==
Botafogo

- Copa CONMEBOL: 1993

Linhares

- Campeonato Capixaba: 1995

Rio Branco

- Campeonato Capixaba: 1983, 1985
