= Carlos Alberto (footballer, born January 1984) =

Brazilian footballer

Personal information
- Full name: Carlos Alberto Souto Pinheiro Júnior
- Date of birth: January 8, 1984 (age 42)
- Place of birth: Arês-RN, Brazil
- Height: 1.80 m (5 ft 11 in)
- Position: Right back

Youth career
- 1998: América-RN
- 1999–2003: Cruzeiro
- 2003: Atlético Mineiro

Senior career*
Years	Team	Apps	(Gls)
2004	Londrina	?	(?)
2005	São Bento	?	(?)
2005	Uberlândia	?	(?)
2006	Itabuna	?	(?)
2006	Atlético-PR	?	(?)
2007–2008	Bahia (Loan)	?	(?)
2008	Vitória (Loan)	?	(?)
2008	América-RN	31	(5)
2009	Oeste	4	(0)
2009	Atlético-PR	3	(0)
2010–	Bahia	3	(0)
- * Club domestic league appearances and goals

Carlos Alberto Souto Pinheiro Júnior or simply Carlos Alberto (born January 8, 1984, in Arês-RN), is a Brazilian footballer, who currently plays for Vitória.
