= Pacific DC Intertie =

HVDC power line in the United States

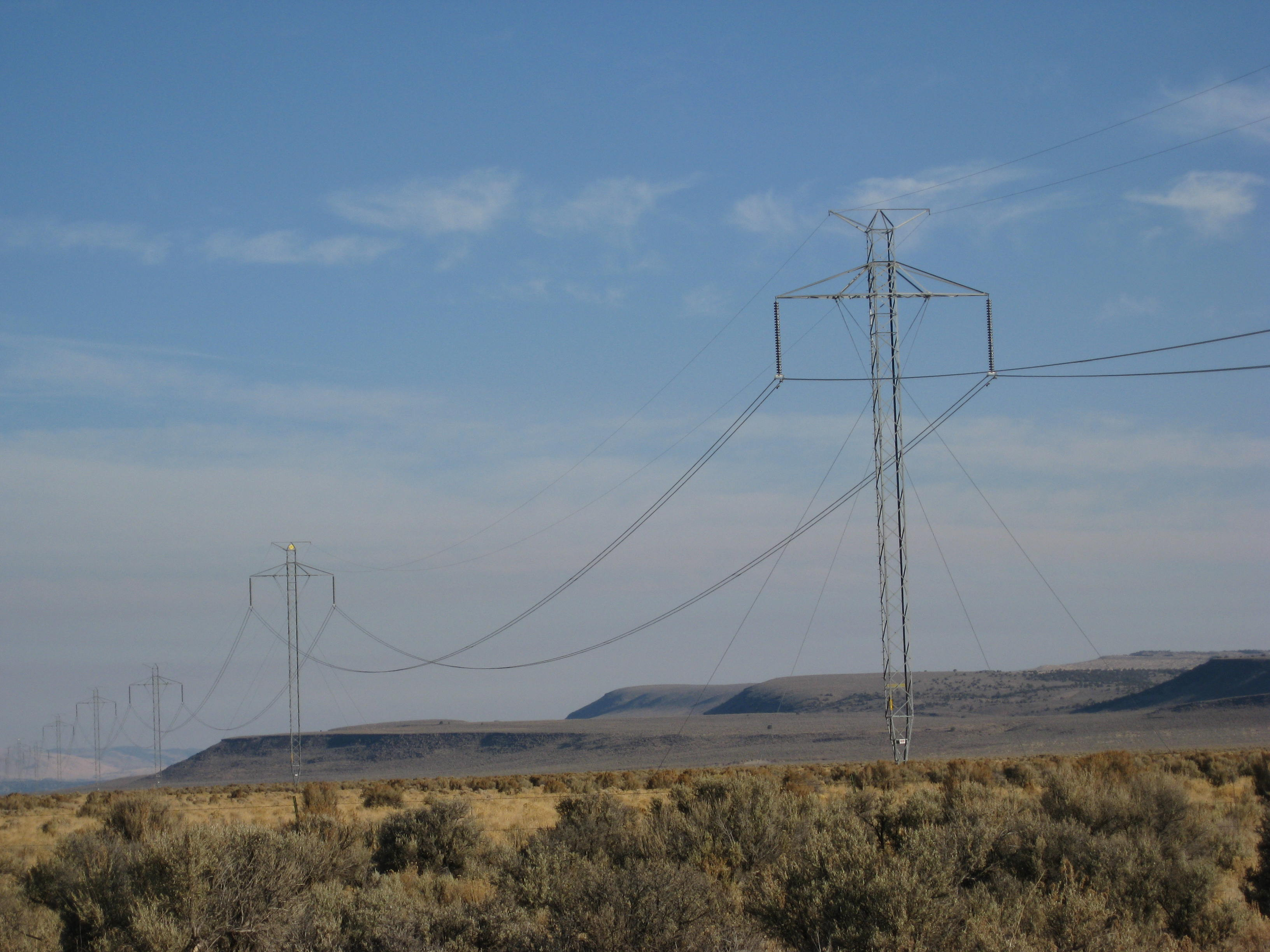
- Pacific DC Intertie guyed pylon, Washoe County, Nevada

Location
- Country: United States
- General direction: north–south
- From: Celilo Converter Station
- To: Sylmar Converter Station

Technical information
- Current type: HVDC

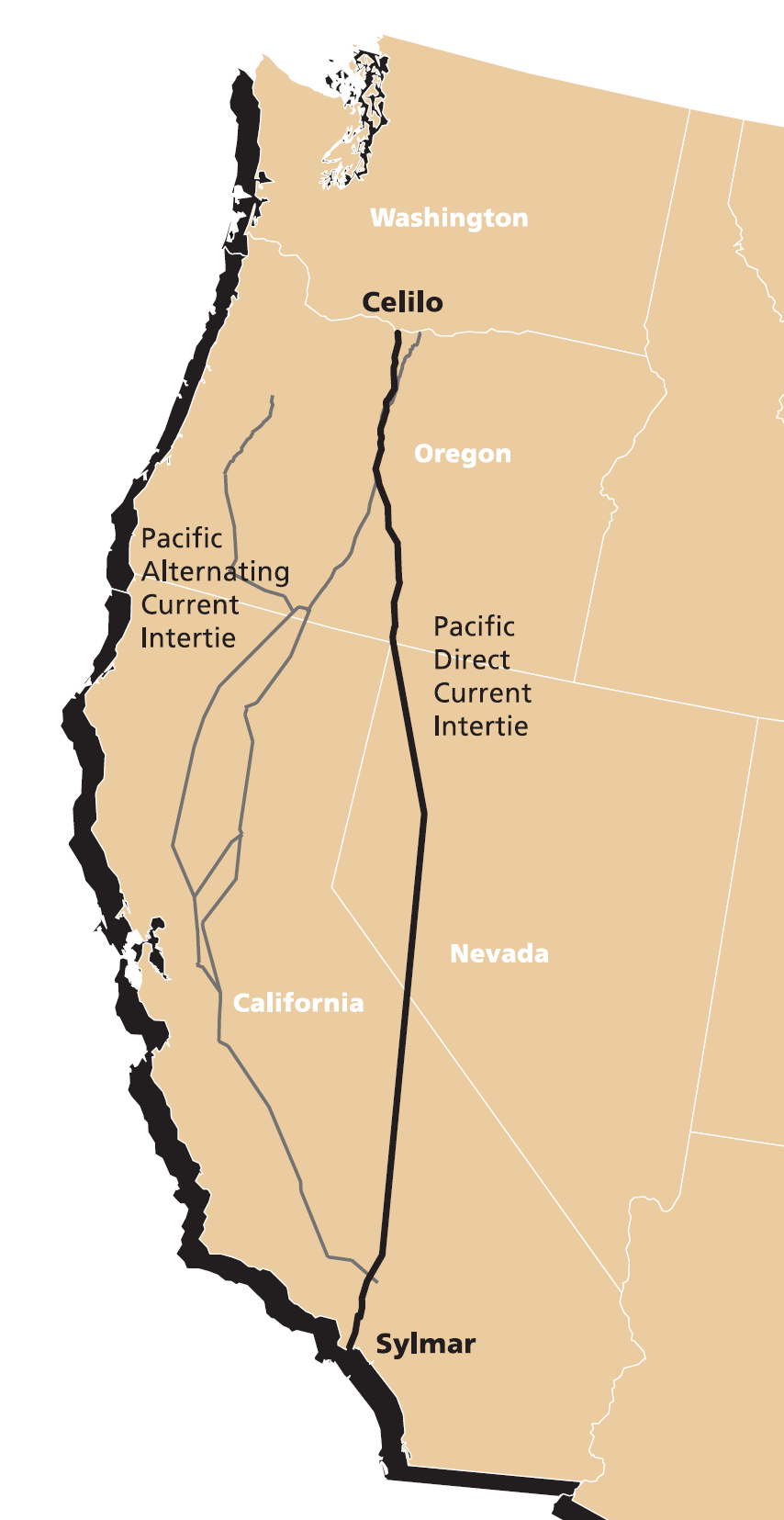
Map of the route of the Pacific Intertie transmission route and stations

The Pacific DC Intertie (also called Path 65) is an electric power transmission line that transmits electricity from the Pacific Northwest to the Los Angeles area using high voltage direct current (HVDC). The line capacity is 3.1 gigawatts, which is enough to serve two to three million Los Angeles households and represents almost half of the Los Angeles Department of Water and Power (LADWP) electrical system's peak capacity.

The intertie originates near the Columbia River at the Celilo Converter Station of Bonneville Power Administration's grid outside The Dalles, Oregon and is connected to the Sylmar Converter Station north of Los Angeles, which is owned by five utility companies and managed by LADWP. The Intertie can transmit power in either direction, with variations between seasons and time of day, but south to north flows are operationally limited to 1GW.

The section of the line in Oregon is owned and operated by Bonneville Power Administration, while the line in Nevada and California is owned and operated by Los Angeles Department of Water and Power. The transition is at the Oregon–Nevada border, at 41°59′47″N 119°57′44″W.

This is one of two HVDC lines serving Los Angeles; the other is Path 27.

== Overview ==
The idea of sending hydroelectric power to Southern California had been proposed as early as the 1930s, but was opposed and scrapped. By 1961, US president John F. Kennedy authorized a large public works project, using new high voltage direct current technology from Sweden. The project was undertaken as a close collaboration between General Electric of the US and ASEA of Sweden. Private California power companies had opposed the project but their technical objections were rebutted by Uno Lamm of ASEA at an IEEE meeting in New York in 1963. When completed in 1970 the combined AC and DC transmission system was estimated to save consumers in Los Angeles approximately US$600,000 per day by use of cheaper electric power from dams on the Columbia River.

One advantage of direct current over AC is that DC current penetrates the entire conductor as opposed to AC current which only penetrates to the skin depth. For the same conductor size, the effective resistance is greater with AC than DC, hence more power is lost as heat with AC. In general, the total cost for HVDC is less than an AC line if the line length is over 500–600 kilometers, and with advances in conversion technology, this distance has been reduced considerably. A DC line is also ideal for connecting two AC systems that are not synchronized with each other. HVDC lines can help stabilize a power grid against cascading blackouts since power flow through the line is controllable.

The Pacific Intertie takes advantage of differing power demand patterns between the northwestern and southwestern US. During winter, the northern region operates electrical heating devices while the southern portion uses relatively little electricity. In summer, the north uses little electricity while the south reaches peak demand due to air conditioning usage. Any time the Intertie demand lessens, the excess is distributed elsewhere on the western power grid (states west of the Great Plains, including Colorado and New Mexico).

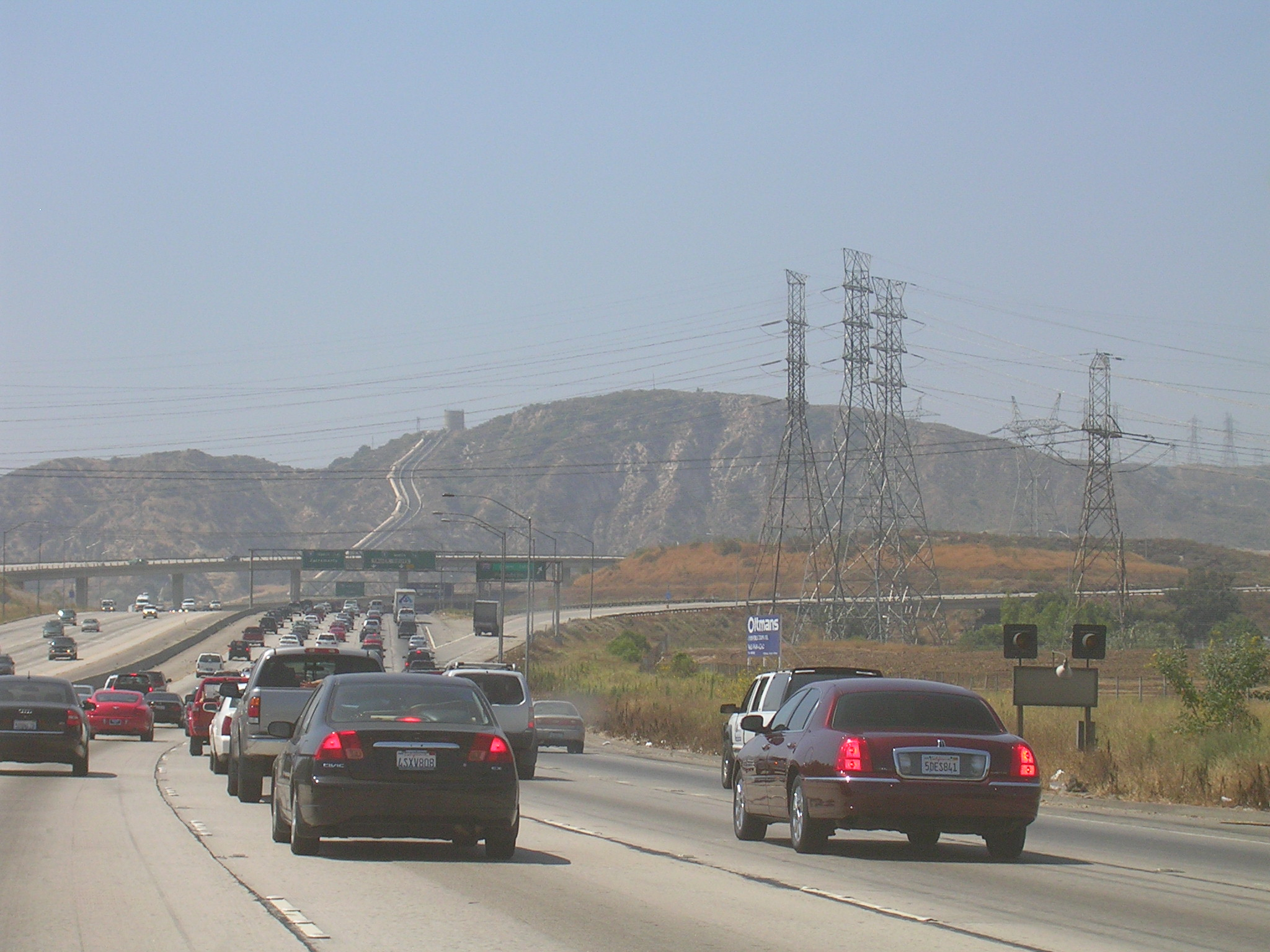
The HVDC power line in Los Angeles (shorter tower carrying two wires on the right). The power line crosses Interstate 5 near the interchange with Interstate 210 in Sylmar.

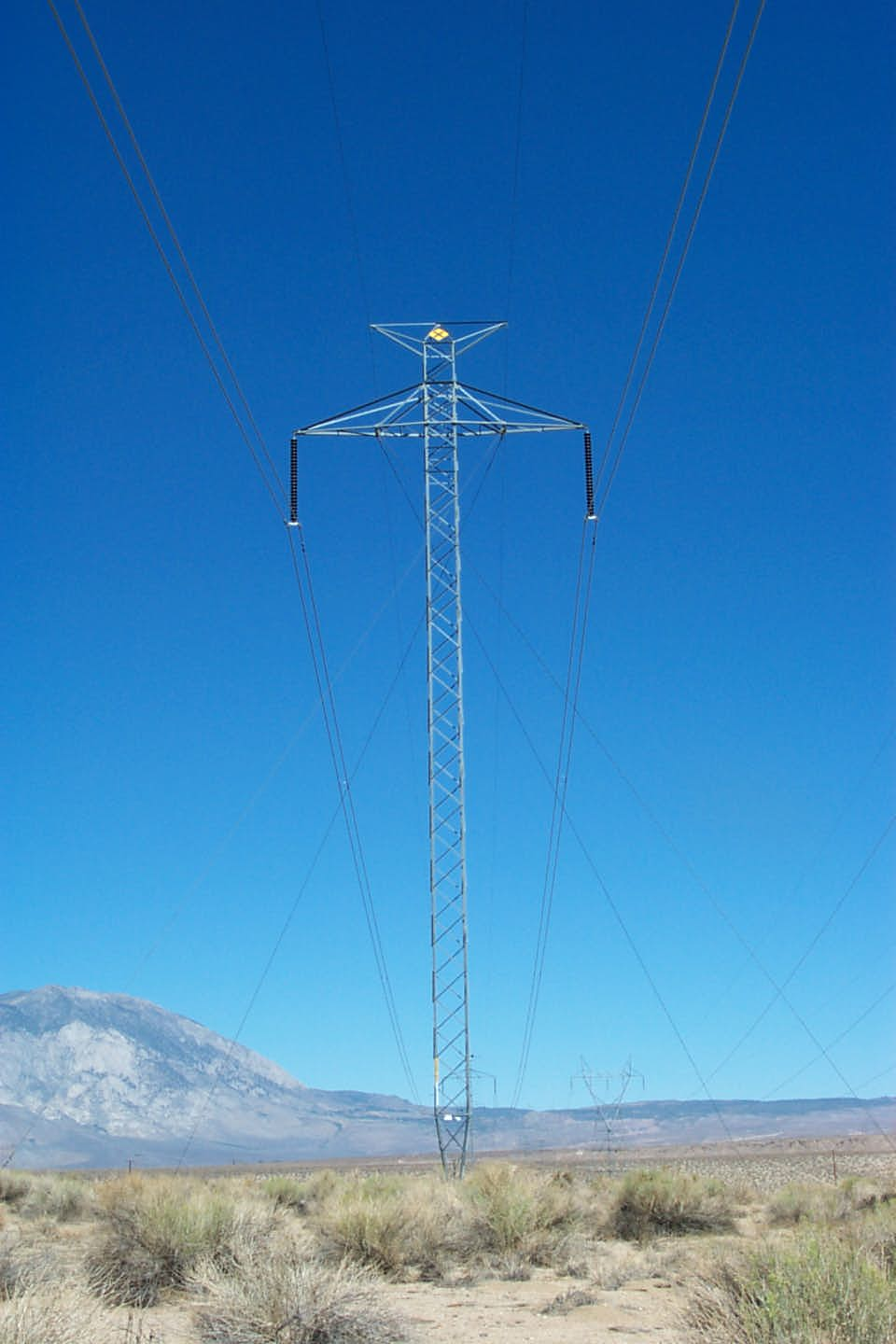
The Pacific DC Intertie along a service road paralleling U.S. Highway 395. Many of the towers of the Intertie are of this simple, slender design

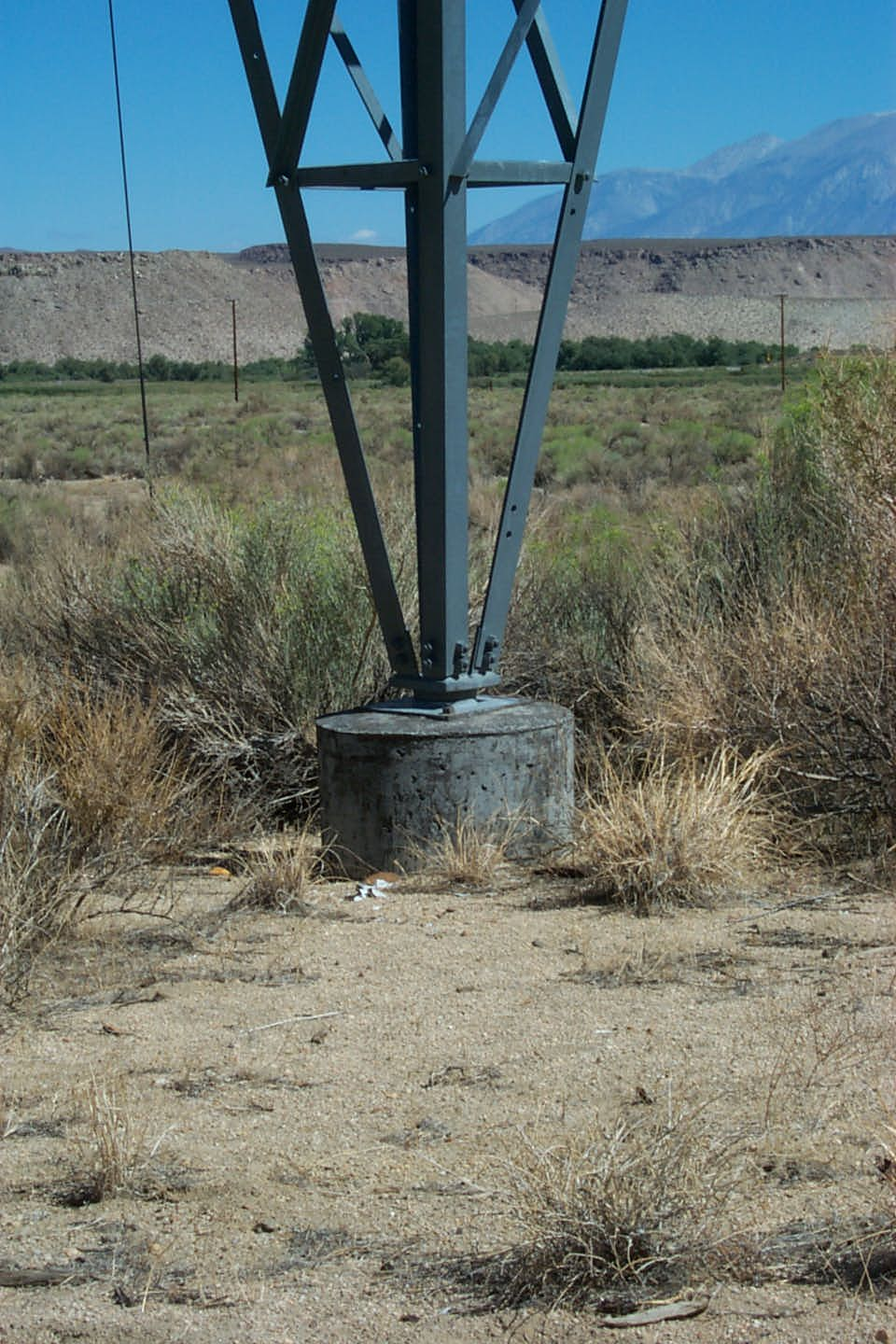
The slender tower's base tapers down to a single point that is bolted to a concrete anchor

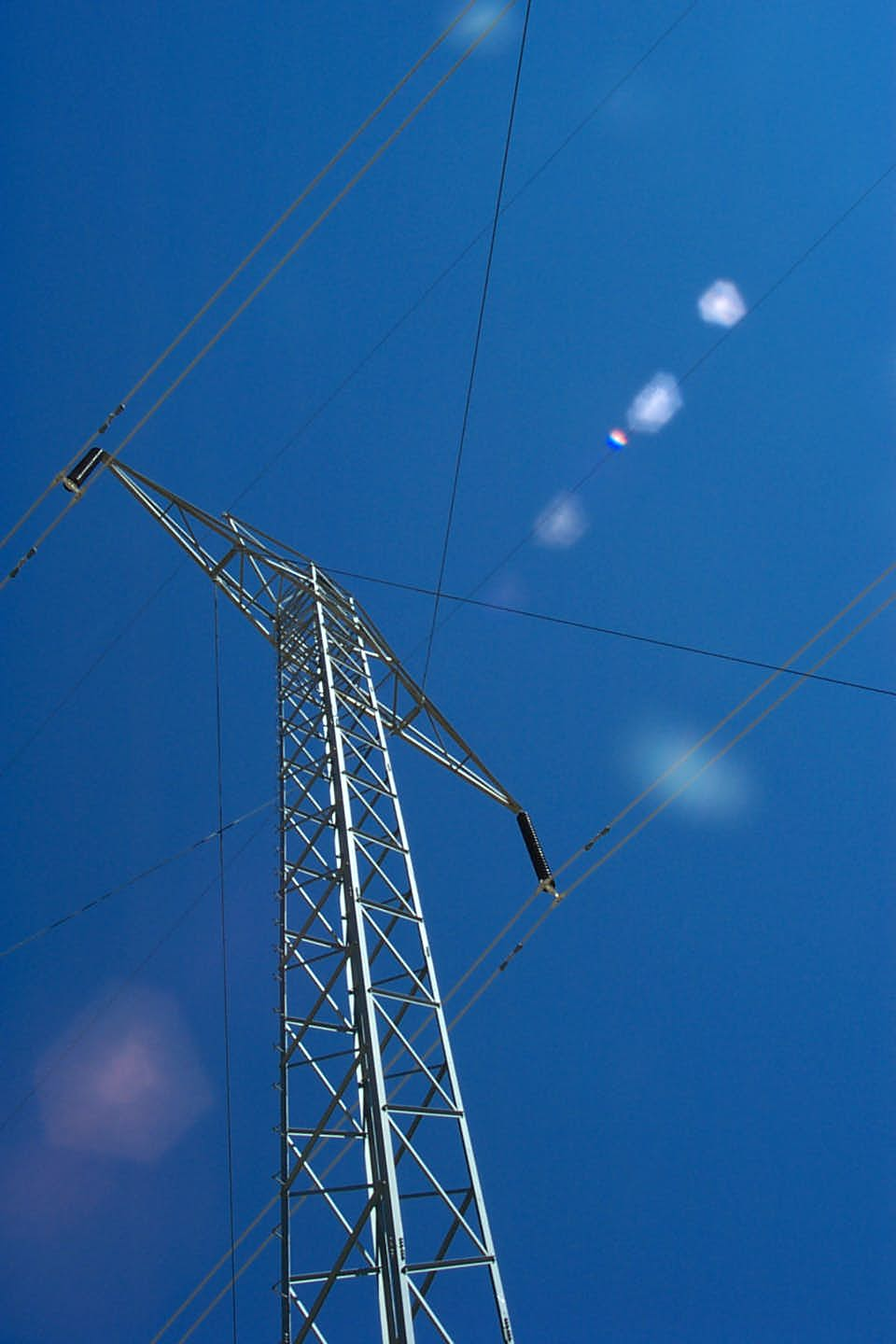
The slender tower is supported laterally by four guy-wires

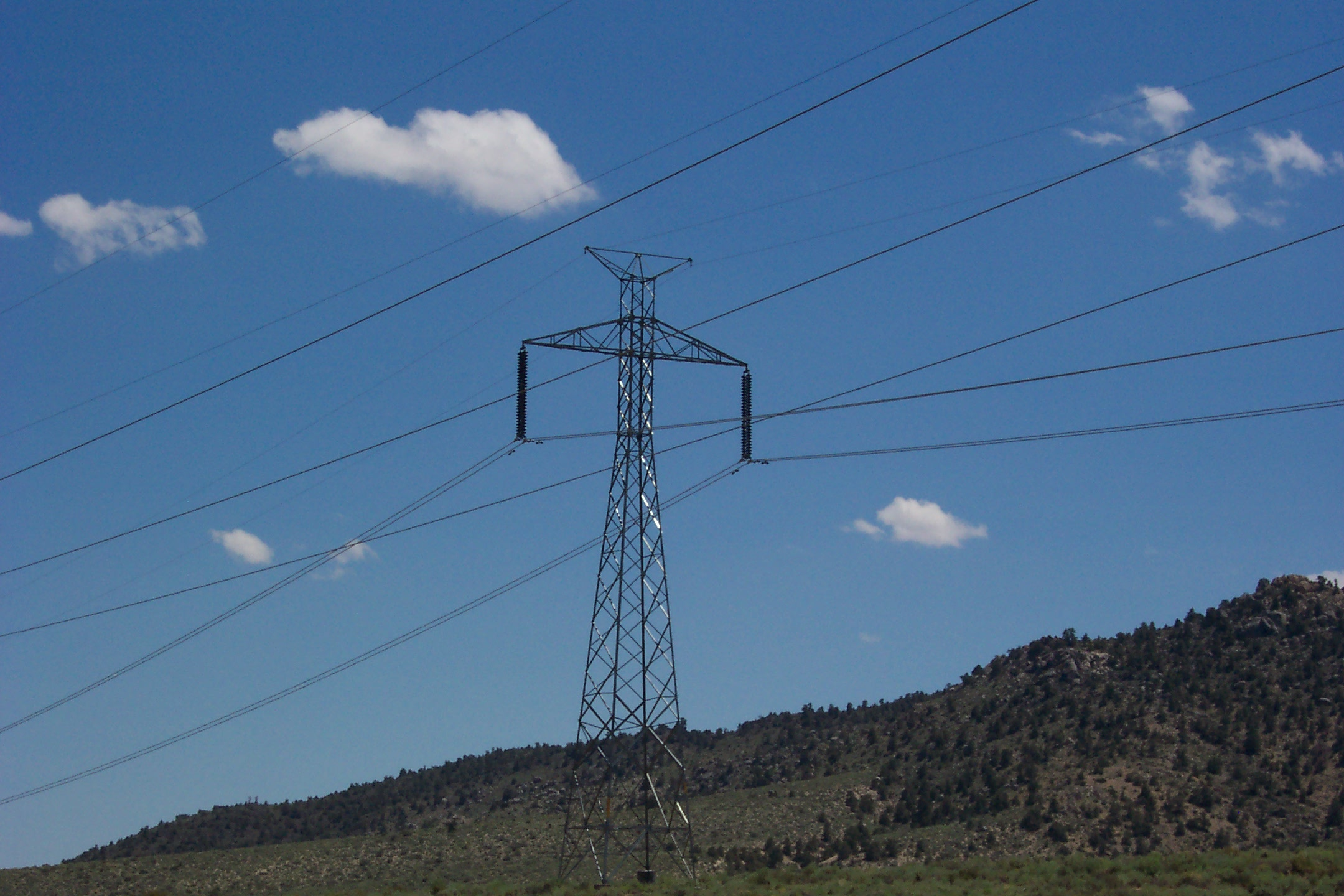
The Pacific Intertie outside of Benton, California

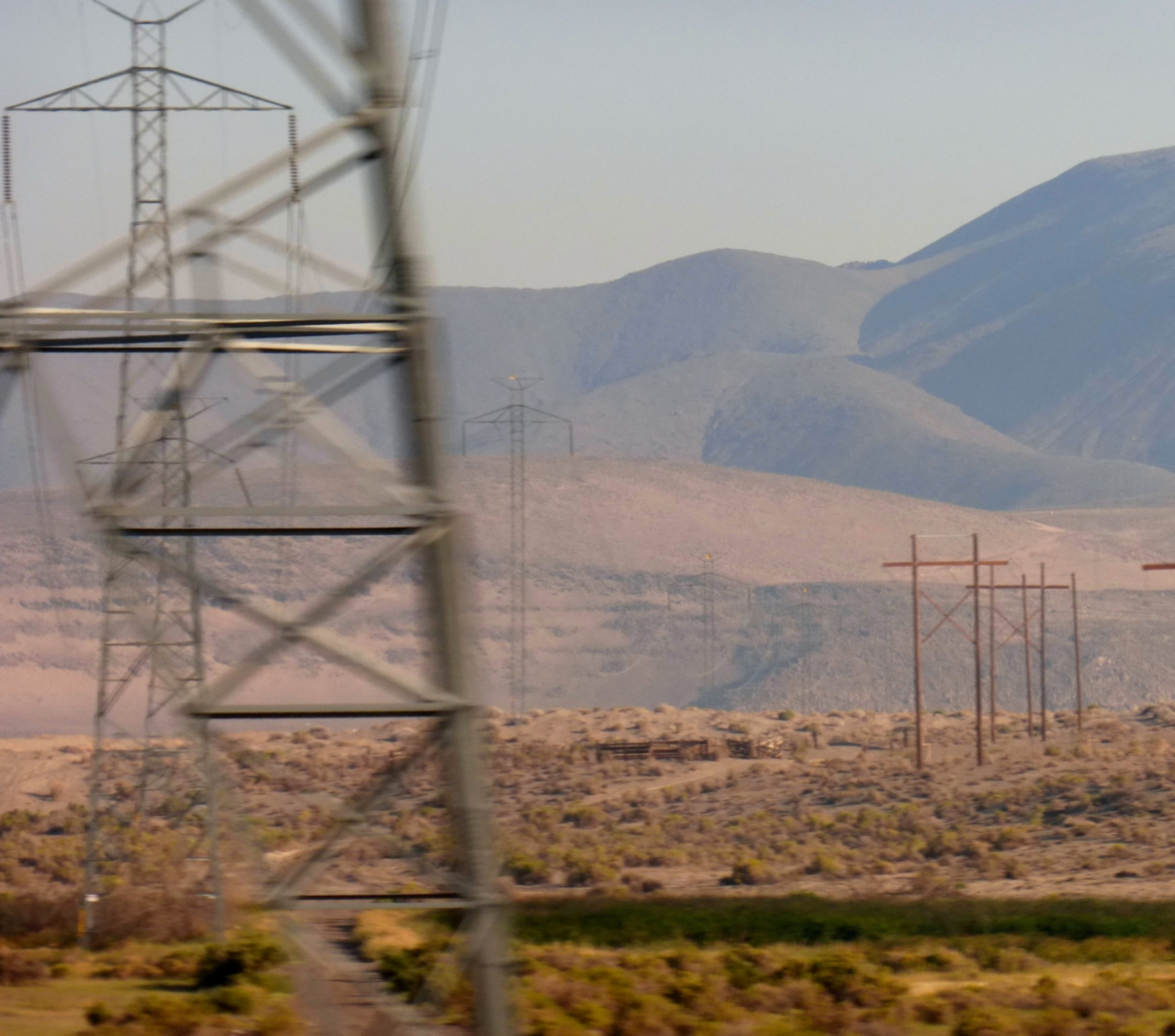
Pacific DC Intertie towers (left side) near Fernley, Nevada. The first few towers are self-supported. The towers on the far side use guy-wires.

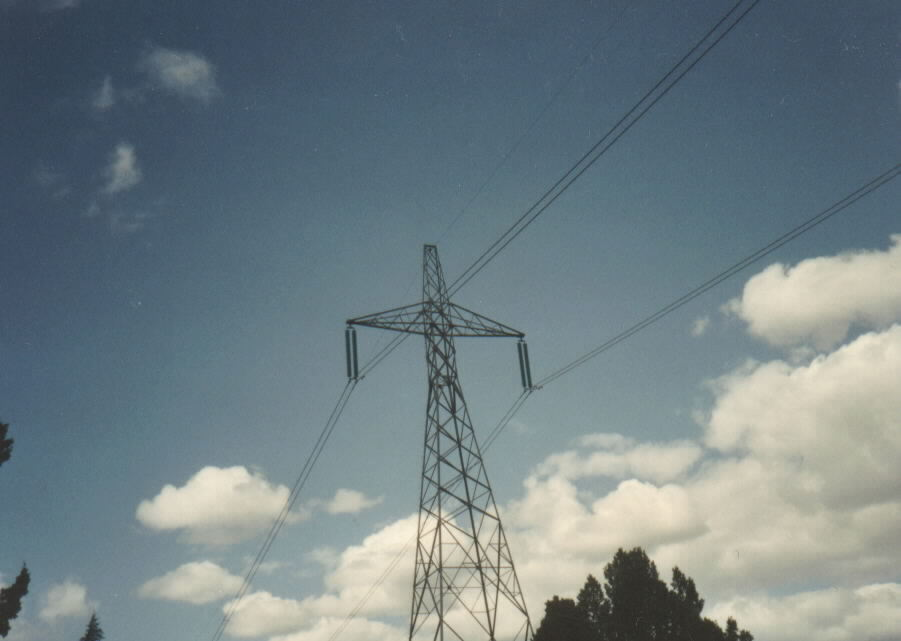
Pacific DC Intertie tower near Redmond, Oregon. The towers in Oregon are self supported with a pointed head.

== Components ==
The Pacific Intertie consists of:

- The Celilo Converter Station which converts three phase 60 Hz AC at 230 to 500 kV to ±500 kV DC (1000 kV pole-to-pole) at 45°35′39″N 121°6′51″W.
  - The grounding system at Celilo consists of 1,067 cast iron anodes buried in a two-foot (60 cm) trench of petroleum coke, which behaves as an electrode, arranged in a ring of 2.0 miles (3,255 m) circumference at Rice Flats (near Rice, Oregon), which is 6.6 miles (10.6 km) SSE of Celilo. It is connected to the converter station by two aerial 644 mm^{2} (0.998 in^{2}) ACSR (aluminum conductor, steel reinforced) conductors, which end at a "dead-end" tower situated at 45°29′51″N 121°03′53″W.
- A 846-mile (1,361 km) overhead transmission line consisting of two steel-cored ACSR conductors, each 1.6 inches (4.1 cm) in diameter with a conducting cross-sectional area of 1,171 mm^{2} (1.815 in^{2}), carrying 500 kV.
  - The two lines when combined have a capacity of 3.1 gigawatts (in bipolar mode).
- The Sylmar Converter Station (34°18′42″N 118°28′53″W) which converts DC to 230 kV AC (a process also called inverting) and is phase-synchronized with the L.A. power grid.
  - The Sylmar grounding system is a line of 24 silicon-iron alloy electrodes submerged in the Pacific Ocean at Will Rogers State Beach suspended in concrete enclosures about 2 to 3 feet (0.5 to 1 m) above the ocean floor. The grounding array, which is 30 miles (48 km) from the converter station and is connected by a pair of 644 mm^{2} (0.998 in^{2}) ACSR conductors, which are in the sections north of Kenter Canyon Terminal Tower at 34°04′04.99″N 118°29′18.5″W installed instead of the ground conductors on the pylons. It runs from Kenter Canyon Terminal Tower, via DWP Receiving Station U (Tarzana; a former switching station), Receiving Station J (Northridge) and Rinaldi Receiving Station (also a former switching station) to Sylmar Converter Station. On the section between Receiving Stations J and Rinaldi, one of the two shielding conductors on each of two parallel-running 230 kV transmission lines is used as electrode line conductor.

== History ==
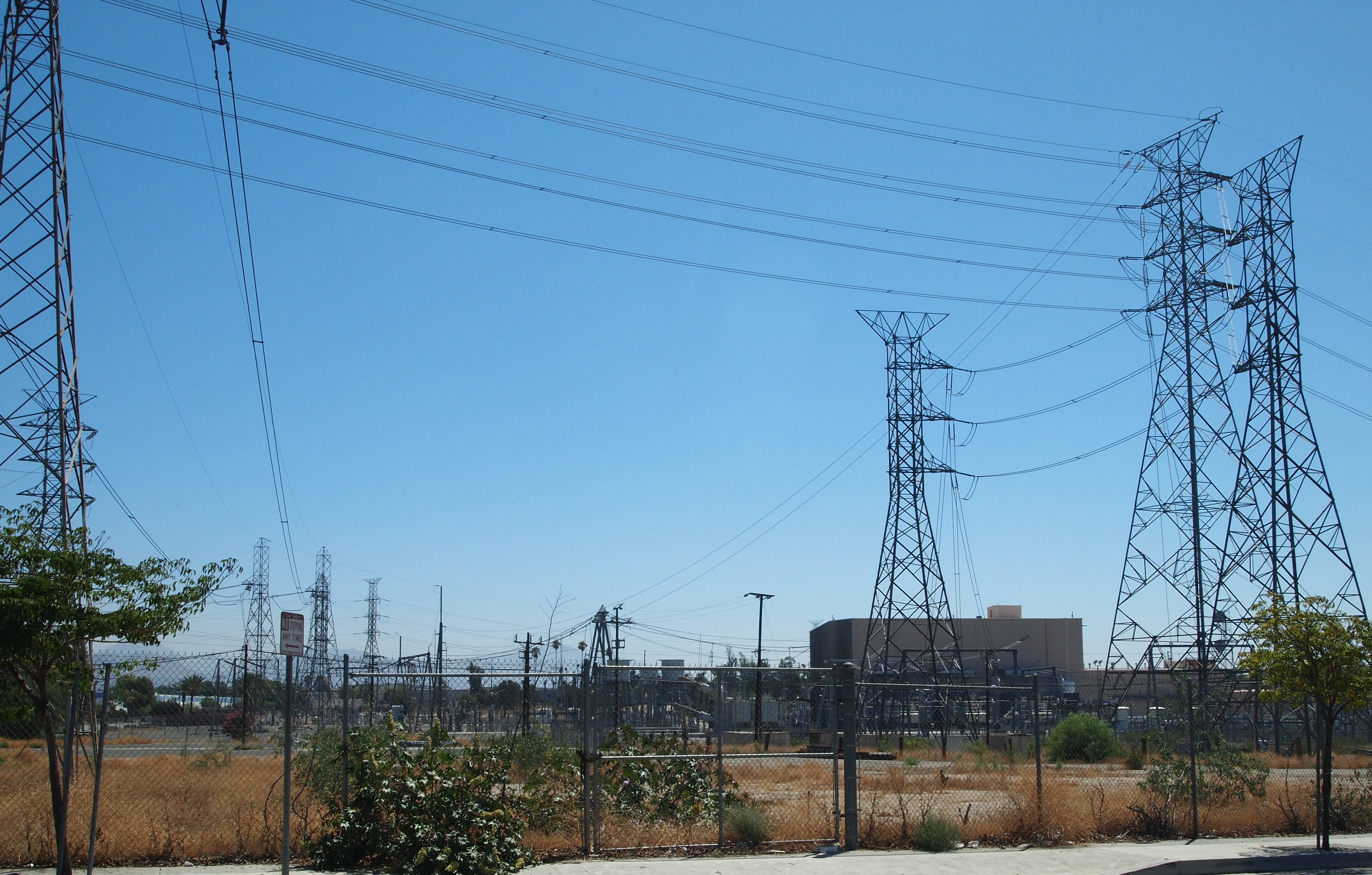
Sylmar East station, rededicated as the Sylmar Converter Station in 2005 following the upgrade to 3,100 MW.

The first phase of the scheme, completed in May 1970, used only mercury-arc valves in the converters. The valves were series connected in three six-pulse valve bridges for each pole. The blocking voltage of the valves was 133 kV with a maximum current of 1,800 amperes, for a transmission rating of 1,440 MW with a symmetrical voltage of 400 kV with respect to earth.

Each converter station housed six mercury arc valves groups, consisting each of seven valves, for a total of 42 valves in each converter. The valves had a width of 7.1 feet (2.15 m), a height of 10 feet (3.2 m) and a length of 11 feet (3.5 m) and weighed 14,000 pounds (6,400 kg). Each valve contained 1.1 litres (37 US fl oz) mercury, with a weight of 33 pounds (14.9 kg).

- 1972: After the Sylmar earthquake, the Sylmar Converter Station had to be reconstructed due to extensive damage.
- 1982: The power rating of the mercury arc valve rectifiers was raised by various improvements to 1,600 MW.
- 1984: The transmission voltage was pushed to 500 kV and the transmission power was increased to 2,000 MW by adding one six-pulse thyristor valve group rated at 100 kV to each pole.
- 1989: A further increase of the transmission power to 3,100 MW took place by installing a 1,100 MW parallel connected thyristor converter in Celilo and Sylmar. This upgrade started in 1985 was called the Pacific Intertie Expansion. This expanded the converter station to two sites, Sylmar West (situated at 34°18′32″N 118°29′13″W) and Sylmar East (situated at 34°18′42″N 118°28′53″W).
- 1993: One pole of the Pacific Intertie Expansion converter station at Sylmar was completely destroyed by fire. The converter was replaced in 1994–1995 by Siemens.
- 1994: After the Northridge earthquake, the Sylmar Converter Station had to be reconstructed due to extensive damage.
- 2004: The Sylmar East station was upgraded from 1,100 MW to 3,100 MW. The controls and older converters, including the mercury arc valves, were completely replaced by a single pair of 3,100 MW 12-pulse converters built by ABB. This allowed the Sylmar East station to handle the full capacity. In parallel with this project, the six-pulse mercury arc valves at the Celilo Converter Station were replaced with Siemens light-triggered thyristors in compliance with their Modified Age Replacement Policy (MARP).
- 2005: The Sylmar East station was rededicated as the Sylmar Converter Station.
- 2014-2015: The Celilo converter substation was upgraded in a similar manner to the Sylmar East upgrade. The North converter was upgraded from 1,100 MW to 3,100 MW. The new converter was built by the ABB. The new converter connects at 500kV AC instead of the previous 230kV AC connection. After completion, all of the equipment for the south converter was removed.

== See also ==
- Uno Lamm
- Path 27
- North American Electric Reliability Corporation
- WECC Intertie Paths
- Path 66
