= Carlo Alberto Baratta =

Italian painter (1754–1815)

Carlo Alberto Baratta (October 16, 1754 – 1815) was an Italian painter.

== Biography ==
He was born in Genoa. His father was a government official. Carlo studied at the Academia Ligustica, and became a pupil of Emanuele Tagliafichi, son of Santo Tagliafico. Like his brother, Antonio Baratta, Carlo was a scenic designer. He also frescoed palaces and chapels; and painted altarpieces. He painted for the Augustinian convent in Sarzano neighborhood. He also painted for the church of Santa Maria del Suffragio in Genoa, altarpieces of the Resurrection of Lazarus and Tobias burying cadavers. He painted a Presentation of the Virgin for the parish church of Bacezia, a St Roch for the church of Bacezia, and a Virgin and Saints Cajetan and Anthony Abbot for San Giacomo di Pontedecimo. He also painted for various churches in Chiavari.
