= Sylmar Converter Station =

AC-DC power conversion station in Los Angeles, California

Coordinates: 34.312°N 118.481°W

The Sylmar Converter Station is the southern converter station of the Pacific DC Intertie, an electric power transmission line which transmits electricity from the Celilo Converter Station outside The Dalles, Oregon to Sylmar, a neighborhood in the northeastern San Fernando Valley region of Los Angeles, California. The station converts the 500 kV direct current coming from the northern converter station Celilo to alternating current at 60 Hz and 230 kV synchronized with the Los Angeles power grid. The station capacity is 3,100 megawatts. It is jointly owned by two electric utility providers, Southern California Edison and Los Angeles Department of Water and Power.

== History ==
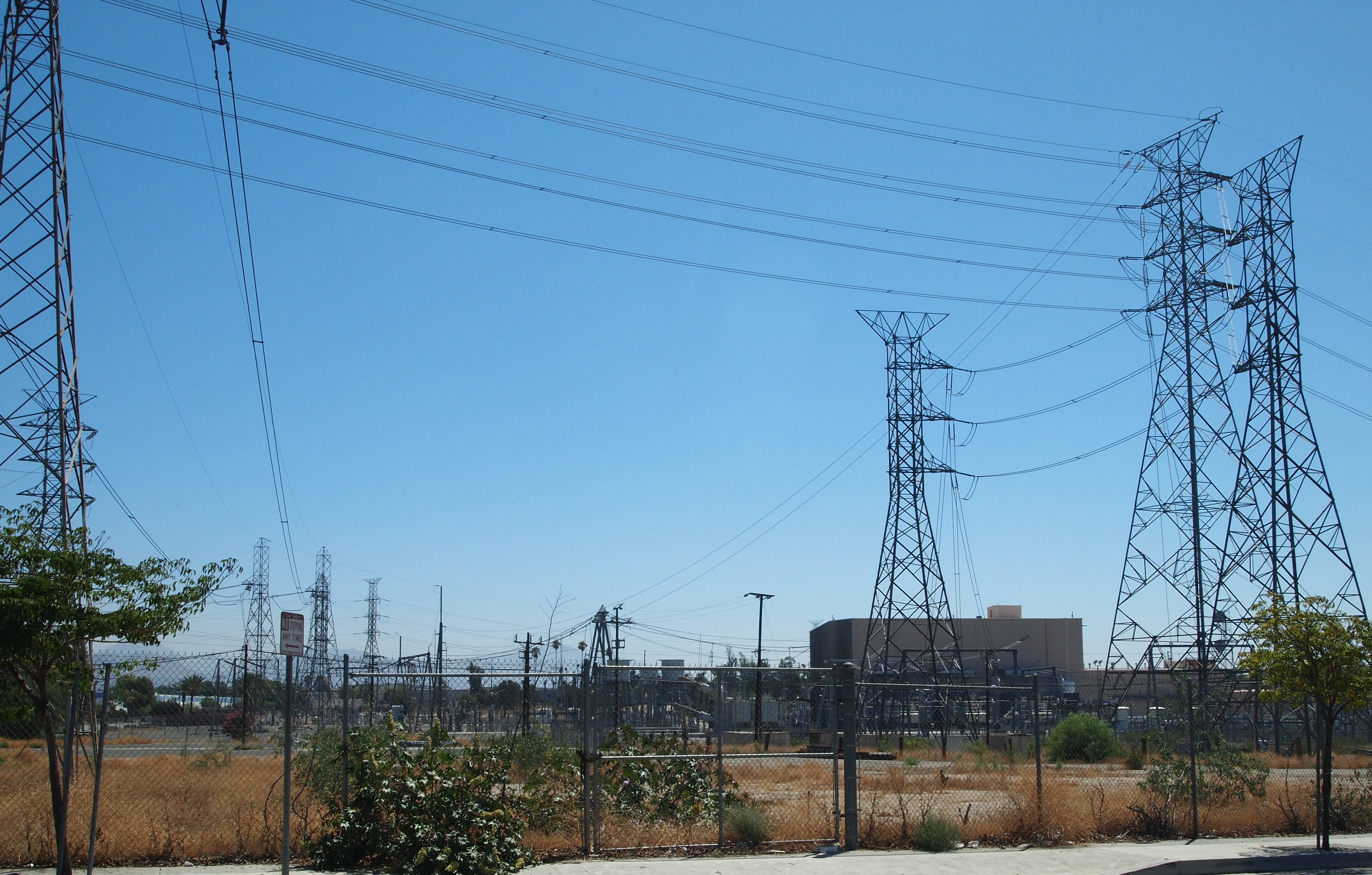
Sylmar Converter Station (Sylmar East) with HVDC on the left most tower and Los Angeles alternating current on the towers to the right.

Originally mercury-arc valves were used as static inverter valves. The valves were series connected in three six-pulse valve bridges for each pole. The blocking voltage of the valves was 133 kV with a maximum current of 1,800 amperes, for a transmission rate of 1,440 megawatts with a symmetrical voltage of 400 kV against earth.

After the Sylmar earthquake in 1971, the static inverter station in Sylmar was reconstructed due to damage sustained.

In 1982, the power rating of the mercury arc valve rectifiers was raised by various improvements to 1,600 megawatts.

In 1985 two six-pulse valve groups of thyristors were added to increase the voltage to 500 kV per pole for a total differential voltage of 1,000 kV. In 1989 the station was extended on the field east of the highway (called Sylmar East Converter Station), where two new 1,100 ampere, 500 kV 12-pulse thyristor converters were added in parallel with the two existing converters, giving a total transmission power of 3,100 megawatts (3,100 Amperes at +/-500 kV

In 2004, Sylmar East station was upgraded from 1,100 MW to 3,100 MW (rededicated as the Sylmar Converter Station in 2005). The controls and older converters, including the mercury arc valves, were completely replaced (in the same valve hall) by a single pair of 3,100 MW 12-pulse converters built by ABB. The upgrade was made to eliminate the environmental risks of mercury and to reduce the maintenance costs of the obsolete mercury arc valves.

== See also ==
- Celilo Converter Station
- Pacific DC Intertie
