= Karl Franzevich Albrecht =

German-Russian musician and composer

Karl Franzevich Albrecht (Russian: Карл Францевич Альбрехт; 27 August 1807 – 24 February 1863) was a German-Russian musician and composer. He was born in Poznań.

Albrecht studied with Joseph Schnabel in Breslau and then worked from 1825 as a violinist in the theater in Breslau and as a conductor in Düsseldorf. In 1838 he was appointed as conductor of the Opera and the Philharmonic in St. Petersburg. Beginning in 1850 he was a singing teacher at the orphanage in Gatchina. He died in Gatchina in 1863.

His son Konstantin Karlovich Albrecht (1836-1893) was a cellist and composer in Moscow.

From Karl Albrecht's compositions, a Mass, a ballet and three string quartets have survived. There are other works by him that are listed as missing.
