= Carlos Alberto Madero Erazo =

Honduran politician

Carlos Alberto Madero Erazo is the Honduras Minister of Labor and Social Security.
