= International Council on Large Electric Systems =

Professional organization in France

CIGRE
- Founded: 1921
- Type: Professional organisation
- Purpose: electric power generation, transmission and distribution
- Headquarters: 21 Rue d'Artois
- Location: Paris, France
- Coordinates: 48.8731°N 2.3049°E
- Region served: Worldwide
- Method: conferences, tutorials, publications
- Members: 1,300 collective and 8,800 individual
- Key people: Michel Augonnet, President; Philippe Adam, Secretary General; Marcio Szechtman, Technical Council Chair
- Website: Official website

The International Council on Large Electric Systems (CIGRE) is a global nonprofit organisation in the field of high voltage electricity. It was founded in Paris, France in 1921. The scope of its activities include the technical and economical aspects of the electrical grid, as well as the environmental and regulatory aspects.

More specifically, the objectives of CIGRE are to:

- facilitate technical exchanges among those involved in the production, transmission, and distribution of electrical energy;
- communicate the state of the art and the technical knowledge in these fields;
- inform the decision makers and regulators in the field of high voltage electricity by means of publication in its magazine Electra or through the organisation of biennial conferences, named Sessions, that take place in even years in Paris, France.

CIGRE membership is open to individuals, companies and organisations involved with any aspect of high voltage engineering. Member organisations and companies are known as collective members.

== Organisation ==
The activities of CIGRE are divided into sixteen Study Committees (SCs):

- A1 - Rotating Electrical Machines
- A2 - Power Transformers and Reactors
- A3 - Transmission and Distribution Equipment
- B1 - Insulated Cables
- B2 - Overhead Lines
- B3 - Substations and electrical installations
- B4 - DC systems and Power Electronics
- B5 - Protection and Automation
- C1 - Power System Development and Economics
- C2 - System Operation and Control
- C3 - System Environmental Performance
- C4 - Power System Technical Performance
- C5 - Electricity Markets and Regulation
- C6 - Active Distribution Systems and Distributed Energy Resources
- D1 - Materials and Emerging Test Techniques
- D2 - Information Systems and Telecommunication

In addition, as of 2020, there are 61 National Committees of CIGRE (NCs), which support the Study Committees in identifying experts to participate in working groups. Beginning with the United Kingdom, Netherlands and Italy in 1923, National Committees have developed progressively around the world to give CIGRE a global footprint. In 2014, the Turkish National Committee was established.

== Activities ==
CIGRE organises several types of conference, of which the biennial Sessions, which take place in Paris in even-numbered years, are the most important and broad-ranging. The first CIGRE session took place on 21–28 November 1921 at 7 Rue de Madrid, Paris, and was attended by 231 high voltage engineers and technicians. Since then, sessions have been held every two years, except during World War II and in 2020 when there was an outbreak of the coronavirus 2019 (COVID-19) worldwide.

The 48th CIGRE session was held in August 2020 for the first time via the internet due to restrictions on travel placed by many countries as a result of the COVID-19 pandemic. It was, therefore, called an e-Session. Whereas the 47th session held at the Palais des Congrès de in Paris attracted 8500 people in total, the e-Session attracted about 1500 live attendances on each day and many offline registrations. The CIGRE Session and its Technical Exhibition bring together more than 8500 senior executives, engineers and experts from the worldwide Power Industry.

In parallel of the Session, a Technical Exhibition is held in the same location on levels 1, 2 and 3. The exhibition offers the opportunity to all visitors, including CIGRE delegates, to discover new services, tools, equipment and materials as well as the most advanced technologies in the field of power systems.

In addition to the biennial sessions, CIGRE organises several other types of conferences in locations other than Paris, including:

- Symposia in odd-numbered years. These usually involve a sub-set of the study committees and concentrate on one common theme.
- Regional conferences covering a variety of subjects but for one specific country or region
- Colloquia which usually involve only one or two study committees.

The Study Committees of CIGRE appoint Working Groups of experts to investigate and publish the state of the art in their chosen field. The output of Working Groups is in the form of Technical Brochures. Technical Brochures are frequently used to inform and act as precursor documents for the activities of national and international Standards organisations, notably the International Electrotechnical Commission (IEC).

== Resources ==
CIGRE creates technical resources that are made available to non-members either freely or for a fee, and to members freely. These include the bimonthly flagship digital magazine Electra, conference proceedings, GREEN BOOKS, Technical Brochures (TBs) and webinars. TBs are a summary of the work of a Working Group.

Electra contains executive summaries of recently published Technical Brochures, as well as selected scientific papers and invited papers.

GREEN BOOKS are a repository of knowledge in a specific subject area and are useful as reference material.

The Technical Committee of CIGRE recently updated the CIGRE White Paper “Network of the Future” issued in 2011 and published in Electra (N°256). This summary paper provides CIGRE’s views on the know-how needed to manage the transition towards future energy supply systems].

== List of National Committees ==
The principle of National Committees came about in 1931 when they were made official. The following table shows a list of National Committees of CIGRE, year they first joined, and their membership numbers (as of 2019):

List of National Committees of CIGRE (under construction)
National Committee	Year First Joined	Equivalent Members
Algeria	1947	45
Andin	1985	--
Arab States of the Gulf	1985	200
Argentina	1959	195
Australia	1953	607
Austria	1932	221
Belgium	1929	167
Bosnia Herzegovina	1951	48
Brazil	1971	909
Bulgaria	1957	--
Canada	1938	405
Chile	1950	176
China	1980	1069
Colombia	2017	105
Croatia	1992	103
Cyprus	--	24
Czechia and Slovakia	1924	87
Denmark	1931	115
Egypt	1974	81
Estonia	2005	34
Finland	--	141
France	1921	547
Georgia	2018	44
Germany	1933	787
Greece	--	232
Gulf CC	1974	173
Hungary	1963	52
Iceland	--	80
India	1969	826
Indonesia	--	200
Iran	1947	60
Ireland	1955	153
Israel	--	44
Italy	1923	323
Japan	1931	886
Jordan	--	76
Kosovo	2019	41
Macedonia	1994	51
Malaysia	1995	120
Mexico	1966	59
Montenegro	2008	40
Morocco	1954	0
New Zealand	2006	121
Netherlands	1921	238
Norway	1931	255
Paraguay	--	81
Peru	2018	61
Philippines	2018	45
Poland	1948	148
Portugal	1947	110
Romania	1926	190
Russia	1921	777
Serbia	--	73
Slovenia	1952	100
South Africa	1948	158
South Korea	1979	450
Spain	1931	357
Sweden	1931	316
Switzerland	1921	406
Thailand	1974	190
Turkey	2014	111
Ukraine	2004	200
United Kingdom	1923	559
United States of America	1921	918
