= Energy in California =

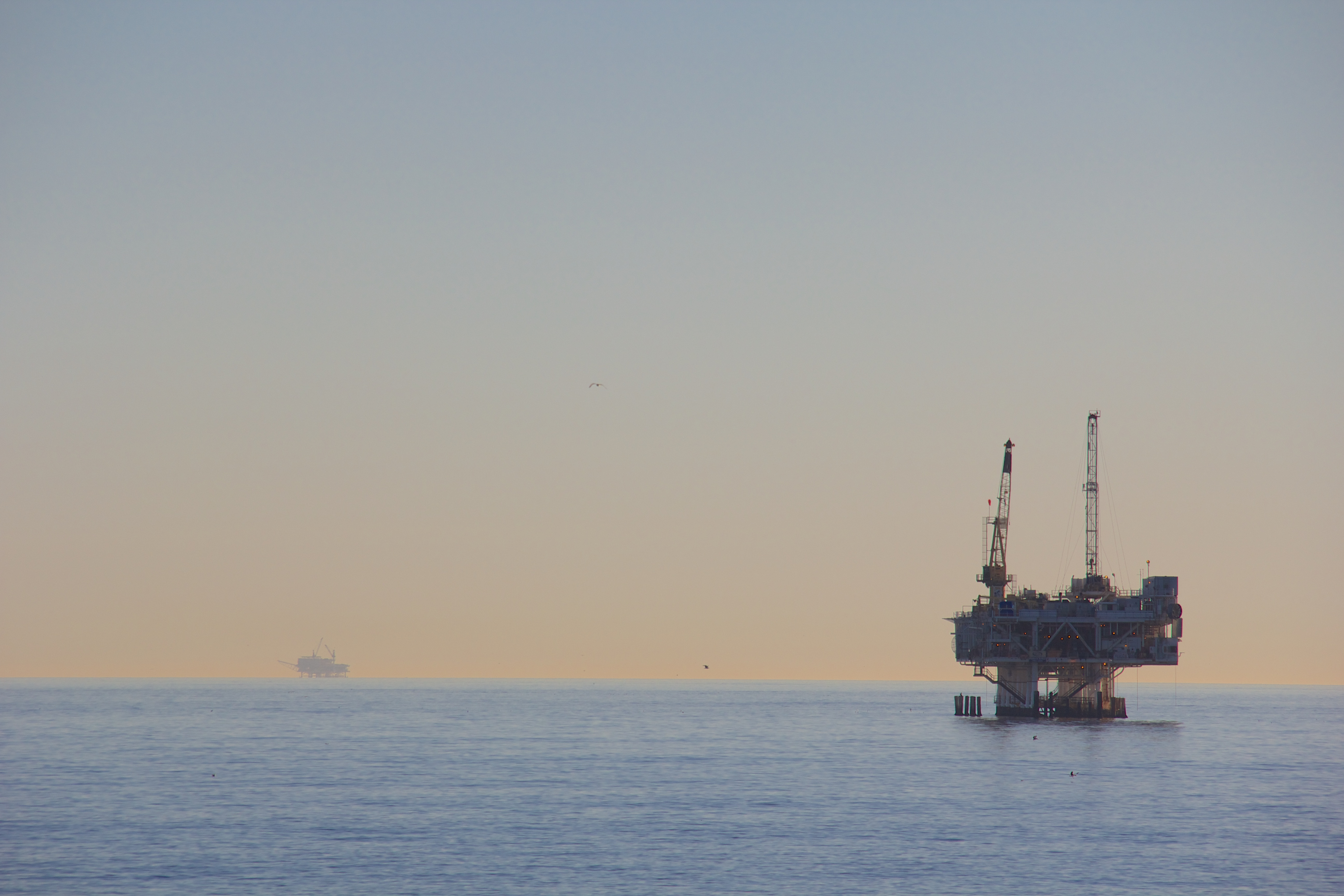
Oil rig from Seal Beach pier, California

Sources of California in-state utility-scale electricity generation for 2024 This accounted for 71% of CA's demand in 2023; the remaining 29% was imported. (does not include residential rooftop solar)
1. Natural gas (40.0%)
2. Renewables - Solar (23.0%)
3. Renewables - Wind (7.00%)
4. Renewables - Other (Geothermal, biomass, small hydro, etc.) (9.00%)
5. Large hydro (12.0%)
6. Nuclear (9.00%)

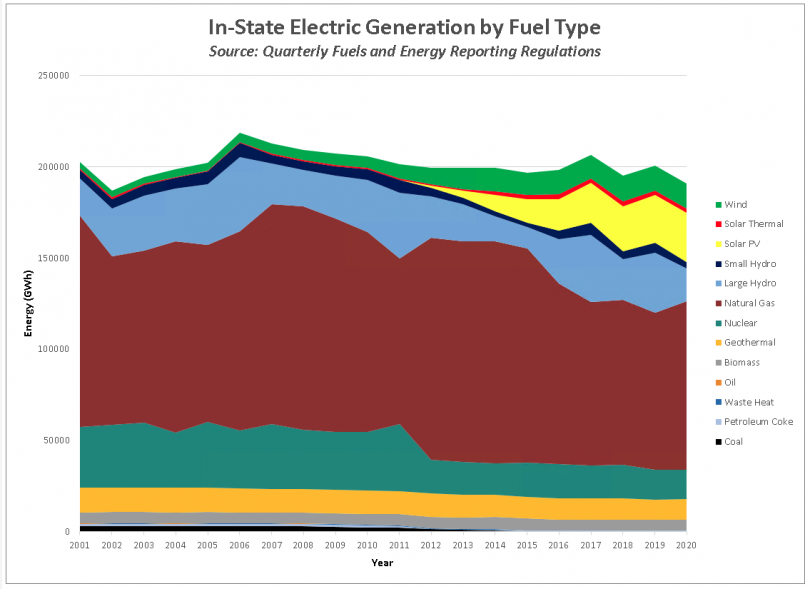
California in-state electricity generation by source 2001-2020 (ignores imports which made up 32% of demand in 2018, but varies by year) - 2012 is when San Onofre Nuclear Generating Station shutdown; 2017 & 2019 were high rainfall years

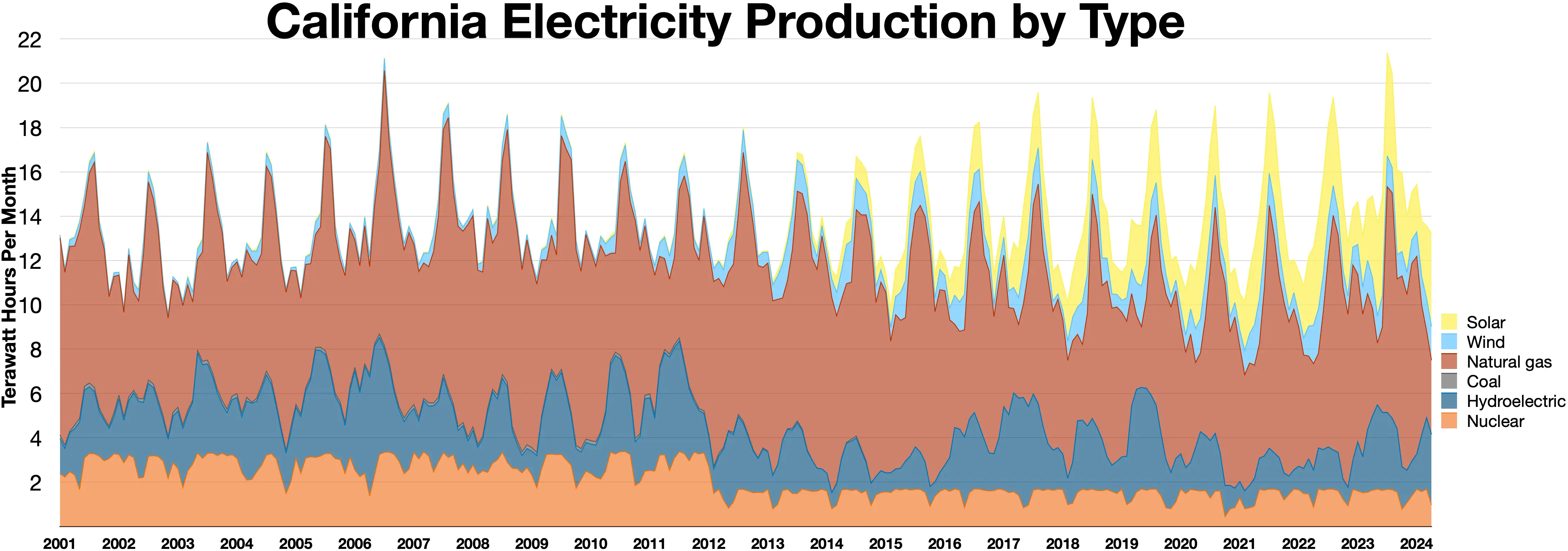
California electricity production by type showing seasonal variation in generation

Energy is a major area of the economy of California, as it has the largest population and the largest economy in the United States. As of 2024, it is second in total energy consumption after Texas, though per capita consumption was the third-lowest in the United States partially because of the mild climate and energy efficiency programs. In 2023, 45% of energy consumption was used for transportation, with California being the largest consumer of jet fuel, and the second largest consumer of gasoline after Texas. As of 2026, the state uses more than 1 million barrels of refined products daily.

While California was the eighth-largest producer of crude oil among the 50 states in 2024, it still imports 75% of the oil it consumes. In 2026, about 25% of the state's crude oil imports were from the Middle East, a higher ratio than any other US state.

The state was the second largest importer of electricity in 2024, and that year produced 57% of its in-state electricity generation from renewables, with the remaining in-state generation being 35% from natural gas and the rest from nuclear. Californians pay some of the highest prices for electricity, with an average price per kWh of $0.26 in May 2025, double the nationwide average of $0.13 per kWh.

== Electricity ==
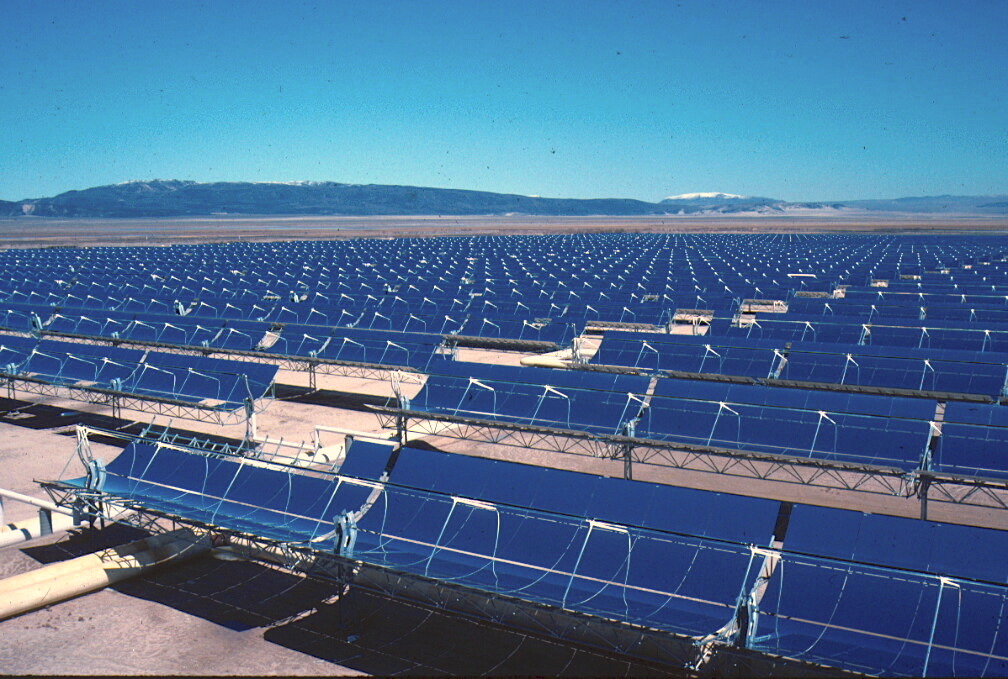
Part of the 354 MW SEGS solar complex in northern San Bernardino County, California.

Natural gas-fired power plants typically account for almost one-half of in-state electricity generation. California is one of the largest hydroelectric power producers in the United States, and with adequate rainfall, hydroelectric power typically accounts for close to one-fifth of State electricity generation. There are plans to remove older dams.

California's peak electricity demand of 52,061 megawatts occurred on September 6, 2022, during one of the longest and hottest September heatwaves on record, which encompassed multiple Western states. Widespread rolling blackouts were narrowly avoided due to conservation efforts, though several thousand customers in Palo Alto and Alameda had their power cut when the California Independent System Operator told those cities' municipal power companies to shed load. The CEO of CAISO stated that the 3,300 megawatts of grid storage batteries added since the August 2020 rolling blackouts were definitely helpful during this event. The previous peak was on July 24, 2006, at 2:44 pm, with 50,270 MW. After the 2006 record, measures to reduce peak load resulted in decreased peak demand, even as the state's population continued to grow. On September 1, 2017, the peak load was 50,116 MW.

Although California's population increased by 13% during the 1990s, the state did not build any new major power plants during that time, although existing in-state power plants were expanded and power output was increased nearly 30% from 1990 to 2001. However, between 2000 and 2015, California built nearly 500 new power plants to supplement the 700 operating in 2000, boosting power supplies by 43%.

In 2016, California Public Utilities Commission (CPUC) announced new rules for connecting coming generation sources to grid. Connection costs must be estimated by the utility, and the developer is limited to paying within ±25% change of the estimate. CPUC expects the rules to lower overall costs for ratepayers. California requires 1.3 GW of utility storage and studies long duration bulk energy storage. The state allocated US$83 million per year during 2017-2019 for behind-the-meter storage. The plan was amended in 2020 to a combined $613 million by 2024.

California's electricity rates are among the highest in the United States as a result of the changing energy mix within the state, including aggressive construction of new natural gas power plants. In 2023, residential electricity bills had increased by 72% on average from 2010, due to several factors: the high cost of renewable generation when CA first started mandating that utilities purchase green power, the cost of subsidizing rooftop solar, and the cost of wildfires (past costs and future mitigation). Due to high electricity demand, and lack of local power plants, California imports more electricity than any other state, (32% of its consumption in 2018) primarily wind and hydroelectric power from states in the Pacific Northwest (via Path 15 and Path 66) and nuclear and natural gas-fired production from the desert Southwest via Path 46. Imported coal-fired electricity ended as of December 2025. In 2018, curtailment was 460 GWh, or 0.2% of generation, but has increased since.

=== Blackouts ===
Major blackouts in California include:

- 1996 Western North America blackouts, caused by a summer heat wave
- 2000–01 California electricity crisis, caused by market manipulation
- 2011 Southwest blackout, caused by operator error
- 2019 California power shutoffs to prevent wildfires, caused by lack of maintenance
- 2020 blackout

In August 2020, during a heat wave which affected the entire West coast, air conditioning usage caused the peak load to hit 47 GW, and CAISO issued rolling blackouts to avoid a larger system shutdown. The state did not have enough generation ready to fulfill demand, and it was unable to import sufficient electricity from neighboring states who had no surplus themselves. A 4 GW demand reduction alleviated the grid shortfall in the days after the blackouts. State agencies identified three main causes: inadequate preparation for heat waves made worse by climate change, insufficient power in the early evening due to sequencing errors in the shift to renewable energy, and market mechanisms that allowed power to be exported during the shortage.

=== Transmission grid ===
The electric grid is made of up electric transmission and electric distribution, with electric production by itself averaging about 44% of the cost nationally. As of 2019, transmission costs are the fastest-growing part of the bill, and Transmission Access Charges (TAC) are applied regardless of how far electricity travels across the grid.

California is part of the Western Interconnection, with transmission lines connecting to the Pacific Northwest including the California Oregon Intertie (with a capacity of almost 5 GW) as well as the Pacific DC Intertie, a HVDC line with a capacity of 3.1 GW which brings (predominantly hydroelectric) power from the Pacific Northwest to the Los Angeles area. From the Southeast, Path 46 brings up to 10.6 GW of electricity from sources including hydroelectric, fossil fuels, nuclear, and solar from generating stations in Nevada and Arizona.

Transmission lines under construction as of 2019 include the TransWest Express, which would connect Wyoming to Nevada, which is already connected to Southern California via Path 46.

While experts have stated that more grid connections to other states would allow California to export its excess solar and wind generated electricity to other states during sunny times of the day, and to import wind generated electricity when wind is blowing in other Western states but not in California, the legislature has resisted allowing more connections for fear of losing sovereignty over the state's electricity supply.

=== Generation ===
As of 2018, California had 80 GW of installed generation capacity encompassing more than 1,500 power plants; with 41 GW of natural gas, 26.5 GW of renewable (12 GW solar, 6 GW wind), 12 GW large hydroelectric, and 2.4 GW nuclear.

==== Legal renewables requirement ====
In 2006, the California legislature passed the Global Warming Solutions Act of 2006 which set a goal for 33% of electricity consumption in California to be generated by renewable sources by 2020.

In 2015, SB350 mandated that electric utilities purchase 50% of their electricity from renewable sources by 2030.

Then in 2018, Senate Bill 100 was passed which increased the renewables requirement for electric utilities to 50% by 2026, 60% by 2030, and 100% by 2045.

==== Natural gas ====
As of 2019, California natural gas plants supplied a third of the state's total demand for electricity, (almost half of the state's in-state generation) and supply the state with 41,000 megawatts of installed capacity. Because renewables cannot generate power 24/7, and it is cost prohibitive to install enough solar panels, wind turbines and batteries to supply sufficient electricity to ensure resource adequacy during extended cloudy or windless periods, researchers have estimated that the state will still need between 17 and 35 GW of natural gas fueled capacity in 2050.

==== Renewables ====
California leads the nation in electricity generation from non-hydroelectric renewable energy sources, including geothermal power, wind power, and solar power. California has some of the most aggressive renewable energy goals in the United States. The state is required to obtain at least 33% of its electricity from renewable resources by 2020, and 50% by 2030, excluding large hydro. On May 13, 2017, the California Independent System Operator (ISO) reported that the state had broken a new instantaneous renewable energy record, with non-hydro renewables providing 67.2% of the total electricity on the ISO's grid, with another 13.5% being provided by hydro. Intermittent solar power has led to a peak demand and peak production imbalance creating a "duck curve", where traditional power plants produce little generation at noon, ramping fast to high generation at dusk.

Solar Energy Generating Systems (SEGS) is the name given to nine solar power plants in the Mojave Desert which were built in the 1980s. These plants have a combined capacity of 354 megawatts (MW) making them at one time the largest solar power installation in the world. Other large solar plants in the Mojave Desert include the 392 MW Ivanpah Solar Power Facility, opened in 2014, and the 550 MW Desert Sunlight Solar Farm and 579 MW Solar Star, both completed in 2015. The Beacon Solar Project, which generates 250 MW for the LADWP, was completed in 2017 in the northwestern Mojave Desert.

The Alta Wind Energy Center in the Tehachapi Mountains is the largest wind power plant in the United States with 1,548 MW installed capacity. A facility known as "The Geysers," located in the Mayacamas Mountains north of San Francisco, is the largest group of geothermal power plants in the world, with more than 750 MW of installed capacity. California's hydroelectric power potential ranks second in the United States (behind Washington State), and substantial geothermal and wind power resources are found along the coastal mountain ranges and the eastern border with Nevada. High solar power potential is found in southeastern California's deserts.

==== Energy storage ====
California has several large pumped-storage hydroelectric powerplants.

Assembly Bill 2514 directed the California Public Utilities Commission (CPUC) to adopt an energy storage program and procurement target. As a result, the CPUC established an energy storage target of 1,325 MW by 2020. In 2014, Southern California Edison commissioned the 8MW/32MWh Tehachapi Energy Storage Project, which was the largest lithium-ion battery system operating in North America and one of the largest in the world at the time of commissioning. The 1-hour 230 MW Gateway Energy Storage project near San Diego became the biggest Lithium-ion grid storage in 2020, and several more are under construction. From 2014 to 2024, the halving time of levelized cost of storage was 4.1 years, while capacity doubling time was 1.2 years.

The California Energy Commission reported that as of mid-2026 total energy storage capacity available to California reached 23,312 MW; with 18,338 MW of it being utility systems, 4,161 MW residential, and 813 MW commercial systems.

==== Nuclear ====
California used to have multiple nuclear power plants, including the Rancho Seco Nuclear Generating Station, the San Onofre Nuclear Generating Station, the Vallecitos Nuclear Center, and the Humboldt Bay Nuclear Power Plant, in addition to various other smaller experimental or prototype reactors which intermittently supplied power to the grid, such as the Sodium Reactor Experiment. All of these reactors have been shut down due to both economic and social factors. California's single remaining operational facility is the Diablo Canyon Power Plant. The owner, Pacific Gas & Electric, had previously agreed to shut down the two reactors at the site in 2025, but California State Lawmakers have since passed Senate Bill 856 on September 1, 2022, to extend Diablo Canyon operations through 2030. The plant produces about 18 TWh per year. and accounts for 9% of total in-state generation.

The 3937 MW Palo Verde Nuclear Generating Station in Tonopah, Arizona exports power to California via Path 46 and is over 27% owned by California utility companies.

==== Hydroelectric ====
- California has several large conventional and pumped-storage hydroelectric powerplants.
- California receives 55.9% of the power generated by the Hoover Dam, on the Arizona/Nevada border, about 2236.38 GW⋅h on average.

==== Coal ====
In December 2025, California stopped importing all coal-fired electricity. Among the last coal generation plants that exported to California included:

- The 1,900 MW Intermountain Power Plant in Delta, Utah was operated by the Los Angeles Department of Water and Power and electricity was transmitted to California via Path 27 until December 2025.
- The 1,540 MW Four Corners Generating Station in San Juan County, New Mexico with 19.2% owned by Southern California Edison. Station was shut down in 2013.
- The 63 MW Argus Cogeneration Plant in San Bernardino County was the last coal-fired power station to operate within the state of California. It was shut down in 2022.

=== Regulatory policy ===
The California Energy Commission is the primary energy policy and planning agency. As of 2017, California is a deregulated electricity market. It has a number of electric load-serving entities, including as of 2015 six investor-owned utilities (IOU), 46 publicly owned utilities, 4 electric cooperatives, 3 community choice aggregators, and 22 electric service providers. Major investor-owned utilities, regulated by the California Public Utilities Commission, include Southern California Edison, Pacific Gas & Electric, and San Diego Gas & Electric. The remaining 3 IOUs are Pacificorp, Bear Valley Electric, and Liberty Utilities.

California has a regional transmission organization called CAISO covering its state, but is not merged with the rest of the Western United States; merging has been a major policy discussion with proposals considered in 2017 and 2018.

In 2025, California passed AB 845 to push forward the creation of a western RTO as part the Pathways Initiative started by utility regulators in Oregon, New Mexico, California, Arizona, and Washington.

California's investor-owned utilities were transitioning to time-of-use pricing, with SD&E slated to roll it out in 2019 and the others rolling it out in 2020.

=== Electricity system data ===
As of 2021, 30.1% of electricity was imported (11.7% from Northwest and 18.4% from Southwest) out of which 22.6% was of unspecified origin and 30.9% were renewables. This compares with 33.6% of in-state generated electricity which comes from renewables.

Energy mix: Total Electricity Source Percentages
Year	Natural gas	Total Renewables	Solar	Wind	Small hydro	Geothermal	Biomass	Large hydro	Coal	Nuclear	Unspecified	Imported	References
2009	42.0%	12.0%	0.3%	3.1%	1.7%	4.6%	2.3%	9.1%	8.1%	13.1%	15.7%		
2010	41.9%	13.9%	0.3%	4.7%	1.9%	4.6%	2.4%	10.5%	7.7%	13.9%	12.0%		
2011	35.3%	14.1%	0.4%	5.0%	2.1%	4.5%	2.1%	13.0%	8.2%	15.2%	14.2%		
2012	43.4%	15.4%	0.9%	6.3%	1.5%	4.4%	2.3%	8.3%	7.5%	9.0%	16.4%		
2013	44.3%	18.8%	1.8%	8.6%	1.3%	4.5%	2.7%	7.8%	7.8%	8.8%	12.5%		
2014	44.5%	20.1%	4.2%	8.1%	1.0%	4.4%	2.5%	5.4%	6.4%	8.5%	15.0%	32.9%	
2015	44.0%	21.9%	6.0%	8.2%	0.9%	4.4%	2.6%	5.4%	6.0%	9.2%	13.5%	33.6%	
2016	36.5%	25.5%	8.1%	9.1%	1.7%	4.4%	2.3%	10.2%	4.1%	9.2%	14.4%	31.8%	
2017	33.7%	29.0%	10.2%	9.4%	2.7%	4.4%	2.4%	14.7%	4.1%	9.1%	9.3%	29.3%	
2018	34.9%	31.4%	11.4%	11.5%	1.6%	4.5%	2.4%	10.7%	3.3%	9.1%	10.5%	31.8%	
2019	34.2%	31.7%	12.3%	10.2%	2.0%	4.8%	2.4%	14.6%	3.0%	9.0%	7.3%	27.8%	
2020	37.1%	33.1%	13.2%	11.1%	1.4%	4.9%	2.4%	12.2%	2.7%	9.3%	5.4%	30.0%	
2021	37.9%	33.6%	14.2%	11.4%	1.0%	4.8%	2.3%	9.2%	3.0%	9.3%	6.8%	30.1%	
2022	36.4%	35.8%	17.0%	10.8%	1.1%	4.7%	2.2%	9.2%	2.2%	9.2%	7.1%	29.2%	
2023	36.6%	36.9%	17.0%	11.2%	1.8%	4.8%	2.1%	11.7%	1.8%	9.3%	3.7%	23,3%	

In-State Electricity Source Percentages
Year	Wind	Solar	Small hydro	Geothermal	Biomass	Large hydro	Coal	Nuclear	Natural gas	Renewable
2009	3.0%	0.4%	2.0%	6.2%	2.9%	12.1%	1.8%	15.2%	56.3%	14.5%
2010	3.0%	0.4%	2.4%	6.2%	2.8%	14.3%	1.7%	15.7%	53.4%	14.9%
2011	3.8%	0.5%	3.1%	6.3%	2.9%	18.2%	1.6%	18.2%	45.4%	16.6%
2012	4.6%	0.9%	2.1%	6.4%	3.0%	11.7%	0.8%	9.3%	61.1%	17.1%
2013	6.4%	2.2%	1.7%	6.3%	3.2%	10.4%	0.5%	9.0%	60.5%	19.6%
2014	6.5%	5.3%	1.2%	6.1%	3.4%	7.1%	0.5%	8.6%	61.3%	22.8%
2015	6.2%	7.7%	1.2%	6.1%	3.2%	5.9%	0.3%	9.5%	59.9%	24.5%
2016	6.8%	10.0%	2.3%	5.8%	3.0%	12.3%	0.2%	9.6%	49.9%	27.9%
2017	6.2%	11.8%	3.1%	5.7%	2.8%	17.9%	0.2%	8.7%	43.4%	29.7%
2018	7.2%	14%	2.1%	5.9%	3.0%	11.3%	0.15%	9.4%	46.5%	32.3%
2019	6.8%	14.2%	2.7%	5.5%	2.9%	16.5%	0.1%	8.1%	43.0%	32.1%
2020	7.2%	15.4%	1.8%	5.9%	3.0%	9.4%	0.2%	8.5%	48.4%	33.4%
2021	7.8%	17.1%	1.3%	5.7%	2.8%	6.2%	0.2%	8.5%	50.2%	34.8%
2022	6.9%	19.9%	1.5%	5.5%	2.6%	7.2%	0.1%	8.7%	47.5%	36.4%
2023	6.5%	19.2%	2.3%	5.1%	2.3%	12.6%	0.1%	8.2%	43.7%	35,3%

In-State Electricity Production, in TWh
Year	Wind	Solar	Small hydro	Geothermal	Biomass	Large hydro	Coal	Nuclear	Natural gas	Total
2002	3.5	0.9	4.4	13.9	7.1	26.9	27.6	34.4	90.9	209.7
2003	3.5	0.8	5.1	13.8	5.6	30.9	27.2	35.6	92.4	214.8
2004	4.3	0.7	4.7	14.0	5.9	29.7	28.6	30.2	105.0	223.1
2005	4.4	0.7	5.4	14.4	6.0	34.5	28.1	36.2	96.1	225.8
2006	4.9	0.6	5.8	13.5	5.7	43.1	17.6	32.0	107.0	230.1
2007	5.7	0.7	3.7	13.0	5.4	23.3	4.2	35.7	118.3	209.9
2008	5.7	0.7	3.7	12.9	5.7	21.0	4.0	32.5	122.2	208.5
2009	6.3	0.9	4.0	12.9	5.9	25.1	3.7	31.5	116.7	207.2
2010	6.2	0.9	5.0	12.7	5.8	29.3	3.4	32.2	109.8	205.4
2011	7.6	1.1	6.1	12.7	5.8	36.6	3.1	36.7	91.2	200.9
2012	9.2	1.8	4.3	12.7	6.0	23.2	1.6	18.5	121.7	199.1
2013	12.7	4.3	3.3	12.5	6.4	20.8	1.0	17.9	120.9	199.8
2014	13.1	10.6	2.7	12.2	6.8	13.7	1.0	17.0	122.0	199.2
2015	12.2	15.0	2.4	12.0	6.4	11.6	0.5	18.5	117.5	196.5
2016	13.5	19.8	4.6	11.6	5.9	24.2	0.3	18.9	98.8	198.2
2017	12.9	24.3	6.4	11.7	5.8	36.9	0.3	17.9	89.6	206.3
2018	14.0	27.3	4.2	11.5	5.9	22.1	0.3	18.3	90.7	194.8
2019	13.7	28.5	5.3	10.9	5.9	33.1	0.3	16.1	86.1	200.5
2020	13.7	29.5	3.5	11.3	5.7	17.9	0.3	16.3	92.3	190.9
2021	15.2	33.3	2.5	11.1	5.4	12.0	0.3	16.5	97.4	194.1
2022	14.0	40.5	3.0	11.1	5.4	14.6	0.3	17.6	96.5	203.3
2023	13.9	41.3	4.9	11.0	5.0	27.1	0.3	17.7	94.2	215.6

Peak Loads for each year in Megawatts

- 44,659 Wed, Aug 12, 1998 02:30 PM
- 45,884 Mon, Jul 12, 1999 04:52 PM
- 43,784 Wed, Aug 16, 2000 03:17 PM
- 41,419 Tue, Aug 7, 2001 04:17 PM
- 42,441 Wed, Jul 10, 2002 03:01 PM
- 42,689 Thu, Jul 17, 2003 03:22 PM
- 45,597 Wed, Sep 8, 2004 04:00 PM
- 45,431 Wed, Jul 20, 2005 03:22 PM
- 50,270 Mon, Jul 24, 2006 02:44 PM
- 48,615 Fri, Aug 31, 2007 03:27 PM
- 46,897 Fri, Jun 20, 2008 04:21 PM
- 46,042 Thu, Sep 3, 2009 04:17 PM
- 47,350 Wed, Aug 25, 2010 04:20 PM
- 45,545 Wed, Sep 7, 2011 04:30 PM
- 46,846 Mon, Aug 13, 2012 03:53 PM
- 45,097 Fri, Jun 28, 2013 04:54 PM
- 45,089 Mon, Sep 15, 2014 04:53 PM
- 46,519 Thu, Sep 10, 2015 03:38 PM
- 46,232 Wed, Jul 27, 2016 04:51 PM
- 50,116 Fri, Sep 1, 2017 03:58 PM
- 46,427 Wed, Jul 25, 2018 05:33 PM
- 44,301 Thu, Aug 15, 2019 05:50 PM
- 47,121 Tue, Aug 18, 2020 03:57 PM
- 43,982 Wed, Sep 8, 2021 05:50 PM
- 52,061 Tue, Sep 6, 2022 04:57 PM
- 44,534 Wed, Aug 16, 2023 05:59 PM
- 48,323 Thu, Sept 5, 2024 04:59 PM

=== Consumption increase for economy-wide decarbonization ===
California's total plan to decarbonize its economy by 2045 would require up to 70% more electricity consumption compared to 2022, in order to decarbonize parts of the economy reliant on fossil fuels, like the transportation sector and residential heating.

== Petroleum production ==
Net Taxable Gasoline Sales
Year	Gallons	m^{3}	Change
2000	14,544,627,116	55.1×10^{6}	
2005	15,937,855,020	60.3×10^{6}	
2010	14,868,892,787	56.3×10^{6}	
2015	15,105,348,840	57.2×10^{6}	
2016	15,487,956,872	58.6×10^{6}	+2.5%
2017	15,579,525,920	59.0×10^{6}	+0.6%
2018	15,517,383,271	58.7×10^{6}	−0.4%
2019	15,428,040,813	58.4×10^{6}	−0.6%
2020	12,497,552,636	47.3×10^{6}	−19.0%
2021	13,822,186,081	52.3×10^{6}	+10.6%
2022	13,629,998,406	51.6×10^{6}	−1.4%

California's crude oil and natural gas deposits are located in six geological basins in the Central Valley and along the coast. California has more than a dozen of the United States' largest oil fields, including the Midway-Sunset Oil Field, the second largest oil field in the contiguous United States.

As of 2022, California's crude oil output accounted for about 3% of total U.S. production. Drilling operations are concentrated primarily in Kern County and the Los Angeles Basin. With twenty seven platforms along the coast as of 2020, there is substantial offshore oil and gas production. There is a permanent moratorium on new offshore oil and gas leasing in California waters and a deferral of leasing in Federal waters.

As of 2025, California has 13 refineries with a capacity to process nearly 1,640,000 US barrels (196,000 m^{3}) per day. The refineries' oil supplies in 2024 came from California (23.3%) and Alaska (13.3%) as well as foreign sources (63.5%). The state mandates that a blend of cleaner (and more expensive) gasoline called "Carbob" be sold in the summer months to reduce smog. Because there are only eight refineries in the state that produce that special blend, California's gasoline prices are higher and more volatile than the rest of the nation's.

== Transportation ==
Transportation is a major use of energy, driven in part by long commuting distances. In 2015, transportation was estimated to be the largest source of greenhouse gas emissions, and in 2017 transportation accounted for 40% of total energy use.

Gasoline consumption fluctuates with economic conditions and gas prices, but has generally remained flat since 2000, despite increasing population. In 2017, Texas surpassed California in gasoline consumption, despite California having 6 million more vehicles. Most California motorists are required to use a special motor gasoline blend called California Clean Burning Gasoline (CA CBG). By 2004, California completed a transition from methyl tertiary butyl-ether (MTBE) to ethanol as a gasoline oxygenate additive, making California the largest ethanol fuel market in the United States. There are four ethanol production plants in central and southern California, but most of California's ethanol supply is transported from other states or abroad.

As of 2018, California is a leader in the United States in electric vehicles. California has the second highest rate of plug-in cars in the world, trailing behind Norway, and making up half of the electric car market in the US. The Alternative and Renewable Fuel and Vehicle Technology Program, also called the Clean Transportation Program, arose out of 2007 law and is intended to drive growth in electric vehicles. California faces a potential shortage in charging stations, and setup California Electric Vehicle Infrastructure Project (CALeVIP) program to build more chargers. In September 2020, California Gov. Gavin Newsom issued an executive order requiring all passenger cars and trucks (not delivery, long-haul, or construction vehicles) sold after 2035 be fully electric. Experts have estimated that this will increase California's consumption of electric energy by 25%. California operates Vehicle-to-grid (V2G) programs to let electric vehicles supply power to the grid when feasible, and to increase consumption when supply is ample. As of 2020, California's EVs have a combined charging capacity of 4.67 GW.

== Building energy ==
Buildings use energy for lighting, heating, ventilation, and air conditioning (HVAC) systems, escalators, elevators and water heating. In addition, municipalities pump water which requires energy; by one estimate, about 19% of electricity is used to treat, pump, and discharge water. About 2/3 of California's home heating is supplied by natural gas, and most new homes are constructed with both natural gas and electric heating.

The California Building Standards Code has targeted residential energy efficiency since 1978; Part 11 of the code is the California Green Building Standards Code.

== Natural gas ==
California natural gas production typically is less than 2 percent of total annual U.S. production and satisfies less than one-sixth of state demand. California receives most of its natural gas by pipeline from production regions in the Rocky Mountains, the Southwest, and western Canada. Some of this is seasonally stored in the Aliso Canyon Oil Field, and its 2015 leak caused California to install grid batteries to compensate.

== Sustainable ==
California has led the United States from 2010 to 2017 with its sustainable energy plans (also known as "clean energy"), with Clean Edge's Clean Energy Index for 2017 rating it at 92.0, with the second ranked state being Massachusetts, at 77.8, and North Dakota the lowest at 8.0. California is the only state with extensive deployment of wind, solar, and geothermal energy. California's venture capital investments in sustainable energy are greater than the other 49 states combined, at $2.2 billion in 2012.

=== Energy-efficient lighting regulations ===
In September 2019, the Energy Department announced the reversal of a 2014 regulation that would have taken effect on January 1, 2020 and implemented the last round of energy-saving light bulb regulations outlined by the Energy Independence and Security Act of 2007. The ruling would allow some types of incandescent bulbs to remain in service. California, along with Colorado, Nevada, Washington, and Vermont, adopted its own energy standards. The California regulations were challenged in court by light bulb manufacturers but a judge ruled it was proper under the congressional exemption previously granted.

== See also ==
- Solar power in California
- Wind power in California
- Offshore oil and gas in California
- California oil and gas industry
- California Independent System Operator
- List of power stations in California
- California Electricity Crisis
