= Intermountain =

Intermountain may refer to:

- Intermountain West, geographical region in the Western United States
  - Intermountain states, states generally considered to be part of the Intermountain West
- Intermountain Aviation, a defunct CIA airline company
- Intermountain Healthcare, a not-for-profit healthcare system and the largest healthcare provider in the Intermountain West.
- Intermountain Manufacturing Company, an aircraft manufacturing company in the U.S. in the 1960s
- Intermountain Power Agency, a power generating cooperative of 23 municipalities in Utah and 6 in California
  - Intermountain Power Plant, a large coal-fired power plant at Delta, Utah, United States owed by the Intermountain Power Agency
- Path 27 or Intermountain Power Project Direct Current Line, or simply Intermountain, an HVDC power transmission line
