= Intermountain Power Agency =

Power generation agency in Utah, USA

- Type: Political subdivision of the State of Utah
- Industry: Energy
- Founded: June 22, 1977; 49 years ago
- Headquarters: West Jordan, Utah, Utah, United States
- Areas served: California & Utah
- Products: Electricity
- Owner: State of Utah
- Website: www.ipautah.com

The Intermountain Power Agency (“IPA”) is a public electric power agency in Utah, United States. It generates power for 23 Utah municipalities, 6 electric cooperatives in Utah, 6 California municipalities and one investor-owned utility. IPA owns the Intermountain Power Plant near Delta, Utah, one of the largest coal-fired power plants in the United States. About 75 percent of the generated power is purchased by cities in southern California and the remainder is purchased by cities, cooperatives and Pacificorp in Utah and a cooperative in Nevada. The IPA also runs transmission lines to Mona, Utah, to Adelanto Converter Station in Adelanto, California and near Ely, Nevada.

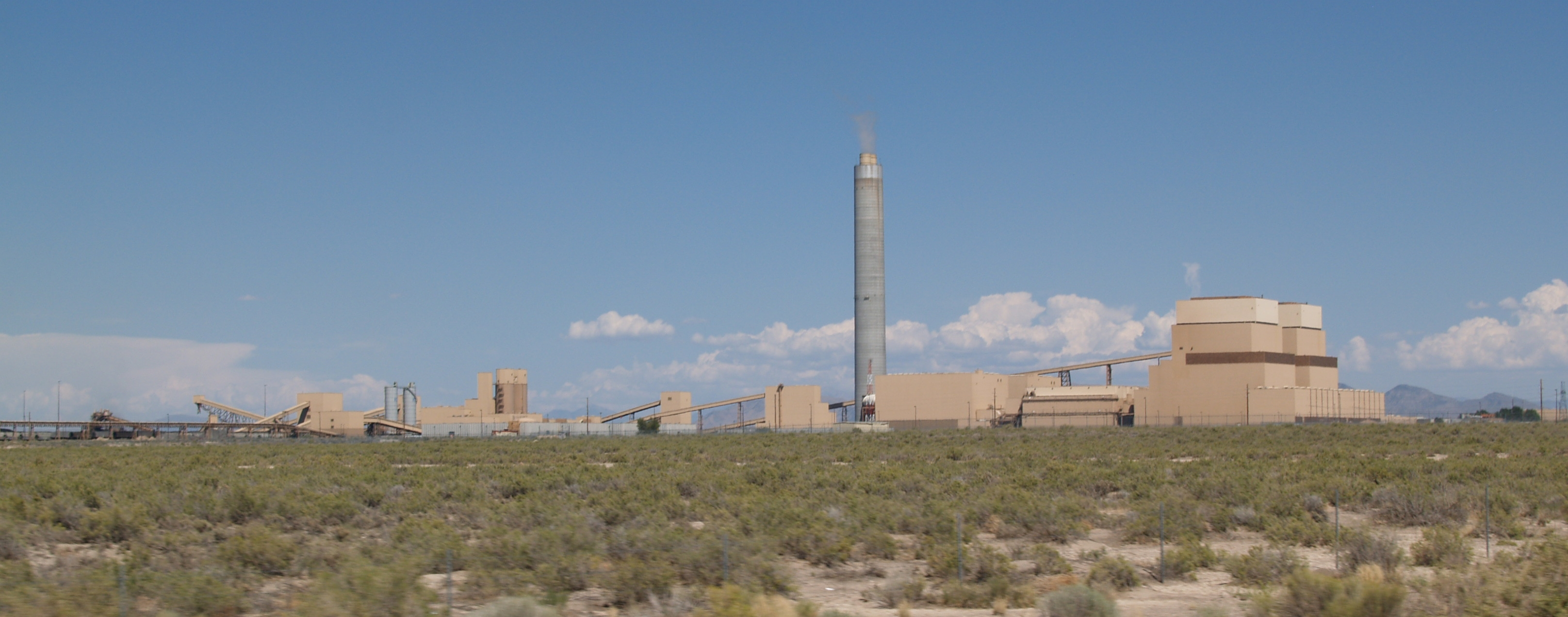
Intermountain Power Project from the ground, 2008.

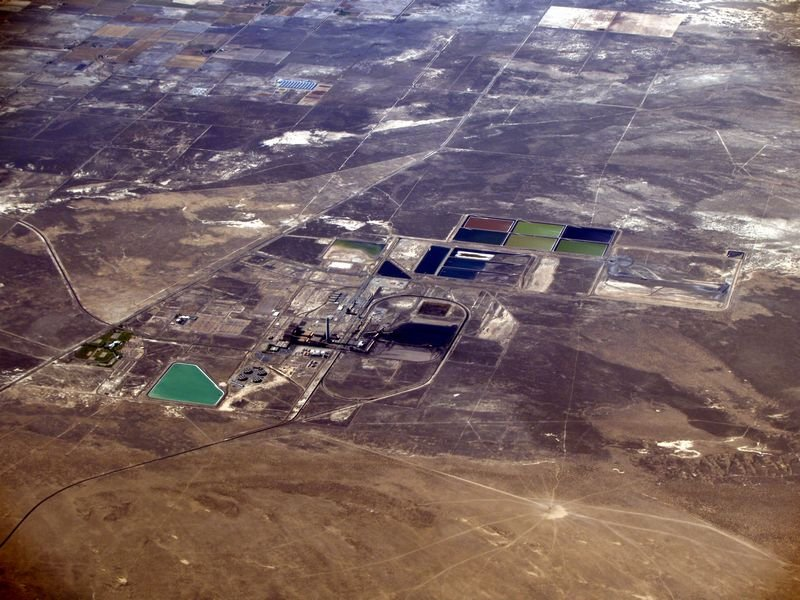
Intermountain Power Project from the air, 2008.

In 2010 the IPA and the Utah Associated Municipal Power Systems filed a lawsuit against the Los Angeles Department of Water and Power for trying to prevent a third coal-fired unit at the IPP generation site due to carbon dioxide emissions concerns. The plant is scheduled to be converted to natural gas by 2025 at a cost of $500 million.

== Cooperative partners ==
Cooperative partners of the Intermountain Power Agency include the following:

=== California purchasers ===
- Burbank City
- Anaheim City
- Glendale City
- Los Angeles Department of Water and Power
- Pasadena City
- Riverside City

=== Utah cooperative purchasers ===
- Bridger Valley Electric Association
- Dixie-Escalante Rural Electric Association, Inc.
- Flowell Electric Association
- Garkane Power Association, Inc.
- Moon Lake Electric Association, Inc.
- Mt. Wheeler Power, Inc.

=== Utah municipal purchasers ===
- Beaver City
- Bountiful City
- Enterprise City
- Ephraim City
- Fairview City
- Fillmore City
- Heber Light & Power Company
- Town of Holden
- Hurricane City
- Hyrum City
- Town of Kanosh
- Kaysville City
- Lehi City
- Logan City
- Town of Meadow
- Monroe City
- Morgan City
- Mount Pleasant City
- Murray City
- Parowan City
- Town of Oak City
- Price City
- Spring City

== See also ==
- Path 27
