= Path 46 =

Set of power lines in California and Nevada

Path 46, also called West of Colorado River, Arizona-California West-of-the-River Path (WOR), is a set of fourteen high voltage (500 kV & 230 kV) alternating-current transmission lines that are located in southeast California and Nevada up to the Colorado River.

This power transmission system has a capacity of 10.6 gigawatts from east to west, and sends electric power to Southern California's massive population centers of Los Angeles and San Diego from many different sources, including hydroelectric dams (Hoover Dam on the Colorado River), nuclear plants (Palo Verde Nuclear Plant, near Phoenix, Arizona), and more recently, utility-scale solar plants (Ivanpah Solar Power Facility)

== Individual power lines of Path 46 ==
Supporting system (230 kV only):

- El Centro – Imperial Valley 230 kV
- Ramon – Mirage 230 kV
- Coachella – Mirage 230 kV

Southern System (500 kV only):

- North Gila – Imperial Valley 500 kV
- Palo Verde – Devers 500 kV No.1

Northern System:

- Marketplace – Adelanto 500 kV – formerly called Path 64, it is part of Path 46.
- Eldorado – Lugo 500 kV
- Eldorado – Lugo 230 kV lines 1 & 2
- Mohave – Lugo 500 kV
- Julian Hinds – Mirage 230 kV
- McCullough – Victorville 500 kV lines 1 & 2
- Hoover – Victorville 287 kV

Although the Intermountain HVDC line follows the route of the northern system (specifically, the Hoover – Victorville and McCullough – Victorville lines) the DC line is not considered part of Path 46. Instead, the line is a distinct path: Path 27.

== Route of the 500 kV lines ==
=== North Gila – Imperial Valley (SDG&E) ===
This power line, maintained by San Diego Gas & Electric (SDG&E), begins at the Imperial Valley substation located northwest of Calexico between the United States-Mexico border to the south and Interstate 8 to the north. The same substation is also the northern end of Path 45, an international power transmission corridor linking the Western US power grid to Baja California, Mexico's power grid. Leaving the substation, the line travels parallel at a distance to the south of Interstate 8 as both head east through Imperial Valley. Just past the Hwy 98 interchange with Interstate 8 southeast of El Centro, the line then runs adjacent to Interstate 8, as infrastructure bunches up to cross the shifting sand dunes. For the next 10 miles (16 km), the line is squeezed tightly between Interstate 8 and the US-Mexico border until both turn northeast. As Interstate 8 crosses over the All-American Canal, the line spans over and departs the freeway, continuing to the northeast. The line reaches the foothills north of Yuma and turns east. Abruptly, after crossing the Colorado River, the power line turns south and heads into the North Gila substation. Another 500kv line, Palo Verde – North Gila, connects the North Gila substation to the Palo Verde Nuclear Generating Station. The section of line east of the Colorado River is referred to as Path 49.

=== Devers – Palo Verde No. 1 (SCE) ===
Also called DPV1, this power line is owned and maintained by Southern California Edison (SCE). Starting from the Devers substation northeast of the San Gorgonio Pass and north of Interstate 10, the line runs north of and roughly parallel to Interstate 10 as both head southeast and pass by Palm Springs. After dropping in elevation to near sea level in the Coachella Valley near Indio, both the line and Interstate 10 climb about 1600-ft out of the Coachella Valley and into Shavers Valley. Upon entering Shavers Valley, the line crosses over I-10 east of the Cactus City exit and continues to the south parallel with the freeway as both continue easterly across the Colorado Desert region of the Sonoran Desert. Both pass Chiriaco Summit and Desert Center with the line never more than 1.5 miles south of the freeway. About 5 miles after passing the Chuckawalla Valley State Prison, the line leaves the freeway and turns south-east for a few miles before turning east in the Palo Verde Valley and crossing the Colorado River south of Blythe. Like the North Gila – Imperial Valley line, the section of this power line east of the Colorado River is also referred to as Path 49. The power line eventually terminates at the Hassayampa switch yard substation adjacent to the Palo Verde Nuclear Generating Station along with the North Gila – Imperial Valley line mentioned above.

A second 500-kV transmission line to be called Devers – Palo Verde No. 2 (DPV2) is planned to run parallel to the existing Devers – Palo Verde line.

=== Mohave – Lugo (SCE) ===
Starting from the Lugo substation in Hesperia, this 500 kV power line heads generally northeast along with the El Dorado – Lugo 500 kV line and two other 230 kV power lines. Both lines cross vast expanses of desert and mountains as they head towards Nevada. Just south of Interstate 40, the Mohave – Lugo line splits from the Eldorado – Lugo line; the Mohave line turns and heads in a more easterly direction than the other power lines. The line roughly parallels Interstate 40 at a large distance up to the California border. The power line then heads northeast to the Mohave Power Station at Laughlin, Nevada. The line terminates there along with another SCE 500 kV line from Eldorado substation.

=== Eldorado – Lugo (SCE) ===
The Eldorado – Lugo 500 kV line follows the same exact path as the Mohave – Lugo 500 kV until south of Interstate 40. The line then continues northeast through the Mojave Desert along with other 230 kV power lines. Although the power lines generally parallel Interstate 15 through the Mojave Desert, they do so at a very large distance and are completely out of sight. As the set of power lines leaves California and enters Nevada, they rises to an elevation of 5,000 feet (1,500 m) before turning to head north-northeast and descending into Eldorado Valley. The 500 kV power line then joins two other SCE 500 kV powerlines, one from the Mohave Power Station in Laughlin, and the other an SCE-built extension of Path 49 from Moenkopi Substation in central Arizona. All three lines terminate at the Eldorado substation, which is connected to the nearby McCullough and Marketplace substations via Path 62.

=== McCullough – Victorville lines 1 and 2 (LADWP) ===
Both McCullough – Victorville 500 kV power lines are maintained by Los Angeles Department of Water and Power (LADW&P) and leave the Victorville substation heading northeast along with the Hoover – Victorville 287 kV line. The Intermountain 500 kV DC power line also joins the group of three power lines a short distance later. After crossing the Interstate 15 for the first time north of the Dale Evens Parkway interchange, the lines turn and head in a more easterly direction to avoid the Barstow area. The lines then cross the Interstate 40 just east of Daggett for their only time and then cross over Interstate 15 again. The set of four power lines generally parallels Interstate 15 at a distance to the north of the highway for the rest of the path in California. The Marketplace – Adelanto 500 kV power line joins the group of four power lines north of Newberry Springs for a short distance before it turns away eastward and follows Interstate 15 closely instead. After the lines pass Clark Mountain to the north, they enter Nevada adjacent to Primm and Interstate 15. At Primm the group of power lines, along with the Marketplace – Adelanto line which has come back, split and spread out across the desert, with lines spanning over each other. After crossing some mountains, the McCullough – Victorville and the Hoover – Victorville 287 kV lines reunite and terminate at the McCullough substation, while several other lines bypass the substation and terminate in other locations, such as the Intermountain line.

=== Marketplace – Adelanto (LADWP) ===
The Marketplace – Adelanto line (formerly path 64) originates at the Adelanto substation (where two 500 kV lines from the San Fernando Valley and another from Victorville terminate) west of the Victorville substation in the High Desert. This same substation is also the southern terminus of the Intermountain HVDC line at the Adelanto Converter Station. As this 202-mile (325 km) 500-kilovolt line leaves the substation, it heads north and parallel with U.S. Route 395 for a while. At Kramer Junction (intersection with State Route 58), the line turns east. The power line then meets the other Path 46 power lines from Victorville along with the Intermountain DC line near Newberry Springs and runs parallels with them for a short distance; all of the lines at this point are now heading northeast. After a few miles, the line crosses over the other Path 46 and Intermountain DC lines and splits off of the corridor; heading towards the Interstate 15 where it runs alongside the highway through the desert until both descend into the Ivanpah Valley. Just prior to the California-Nevada border, the Path 64 line crosses the Interstate 15 once more before turning north and entering Nevada southeast of Primm where it rejoins with the Path 46 and Intermountain lines again north of the community. The now scattered power lines then head in a roughly northeast direction across the desert to the Eldorado - Marketplace - McCullough substation complex. Path 64 ends at the Marketplace substation, where Path 63, another long-distance transmission line from Arizona also terminates.

This power line is operated by Los Angeles Department of Water and Power (LADWP). This line, along with Path 27, the Intermountain DC line and other Path 46 powerlines, supply over 10,000 megawatts of electrical power to the Los Angeles area. Path 64 is an essential line for powering Los Angeles.

== Capacity and source of the electricity ==
The entire Path 46 system has a capacity of transmitting 10,623 megawatts (about 10 gigawatts) from east to west. It has no rating to transfer power from west to east and historically this never happens. It sends electric power to the cities of Southern California such as San Diego, Los Angeles, San Bernardino, Santa Ana, Temecula, Riverside and Bakersfield. The sources of electricity are from hydroelectric dams (like Hoover Dam) on the Colorado River, fossil fuel plants (like the Chuck Lenzie Generating Station in North Las Vegas, Nevada), nuclear energy (like the Palo Verde Nuclear Plant), and more recently, utility-scale solar plants (such as the Ivanpah Solar Power Facility and the Desert Sunlight Solar Farm).

== Expansion ==
=== Devers – Palo Verde No. 2 ===
A new 500 kV line called Devers – Palo Verde No. 2 (DPV 2) proposed by Southern California Edison (SCE) was approved by both the California Public Utilities Commission (CPUC) and California Independent System Operator (Cal-ISO) in the years 2007 and 2005, respectively. The new 230-mile (370 km) 500 kV line will follow the existing Devers – Palo Verde – 500 kV from Devers substation in the San Gorgonio Pass near Palm Springs in California to the Harquahala Generating Station (near the Palo Verde Nuclear Generating Station) in Arizona and will cost $680 million to build. The new line and associated upgrades to the regional transmission system will bring an additional 1,200 MW of electrical power to the Greater Los Angeles area, which is enough to power 780,000 homes.

In June 2007, the Arizona Corporation Commission rejected SCE's application for the line expansion. SCE then appealed to the FERC, and is currently working directly with ACC to find a solution. Construction on the California portion of the line could begin in 2009, but Arizona is not expected to respond before the end of 2009.

In 2011, Southern California Edison began construction on a second line anyway between their Valley Substation in Romoland, CA and the new Colorado River Substation near the Chuckawalla Valley State Prison, west of Blythe, which went into service in 2013. This has some use since 750MW of renewable energy generating capacity was being added in the region. A second line continuing into Arizona was not included in Arizona Public Service's most recent (2014) plan, which covers planning up to 2023.

Both Devers – Palo Verde 500 kV lines are now split into 5 different sections. Devers – Red Bluff 500 kV lines #1 and #2, Colorado River – Red Bluff 500 kV lines #1 and #2, and the Colorado River – Palo Verde 500 kV line. The Colorado River and Red Bluff substations facilitate different solar projects in the area and allow the opportunity to transmit into each station at 230 kV (known as 220 kV within Southern California Edison) or lower voltages and step up to the 500 kV system. There are Series Capacitor stations between Devers and Red Bluff (known as "Cal Caps") and in between Colorado River and Palo Verde (known as AZ Caps).

=== SDG&E ===
San Diego Gas & Electric has also proposed a new 500 kV power line, with its eastern terminus at the North Gila substation and several possibilities for the western terminus and route configuration.

== Incidents ==
=== Wildfires of October 2007 ===
On October 21, 2007 the Harris Fire, part of the California wildfires of October 2007, damaged and disabled an extension of the North Gila-Imperial Valley 500 kV line that heads into San Diego.

=== Power outage of September 2011 ===
The 2011 Southwestern United States blackout that began on September 8, was a widespread power outage which affected parts of western Arizona, northern Baja California, and Southern California. A mistake by an Arizona Public Service employee at the North Gila substation resulted in the loss of a 500 kV line supplying San Diego Gas & Electric's North Gila-Imperial Valley segment on the Southwest Power Link causing one of the largest power outages in history for the Southern California region. Had the utilities affected realized the consequences to the loss of this line, they would have taken steps to eliminate the vulnerability. On April 27, 2012, the Federal Energy Regulatory Commission and the North American Electric Reliability Corporation released their report detailing the blackout and its causes. Most of the areas affected were served by San Diego Gas & Electric Company, and left more than 5 million people without power.
