= Path 27 =

Electrical transmission line in Southwestern United States

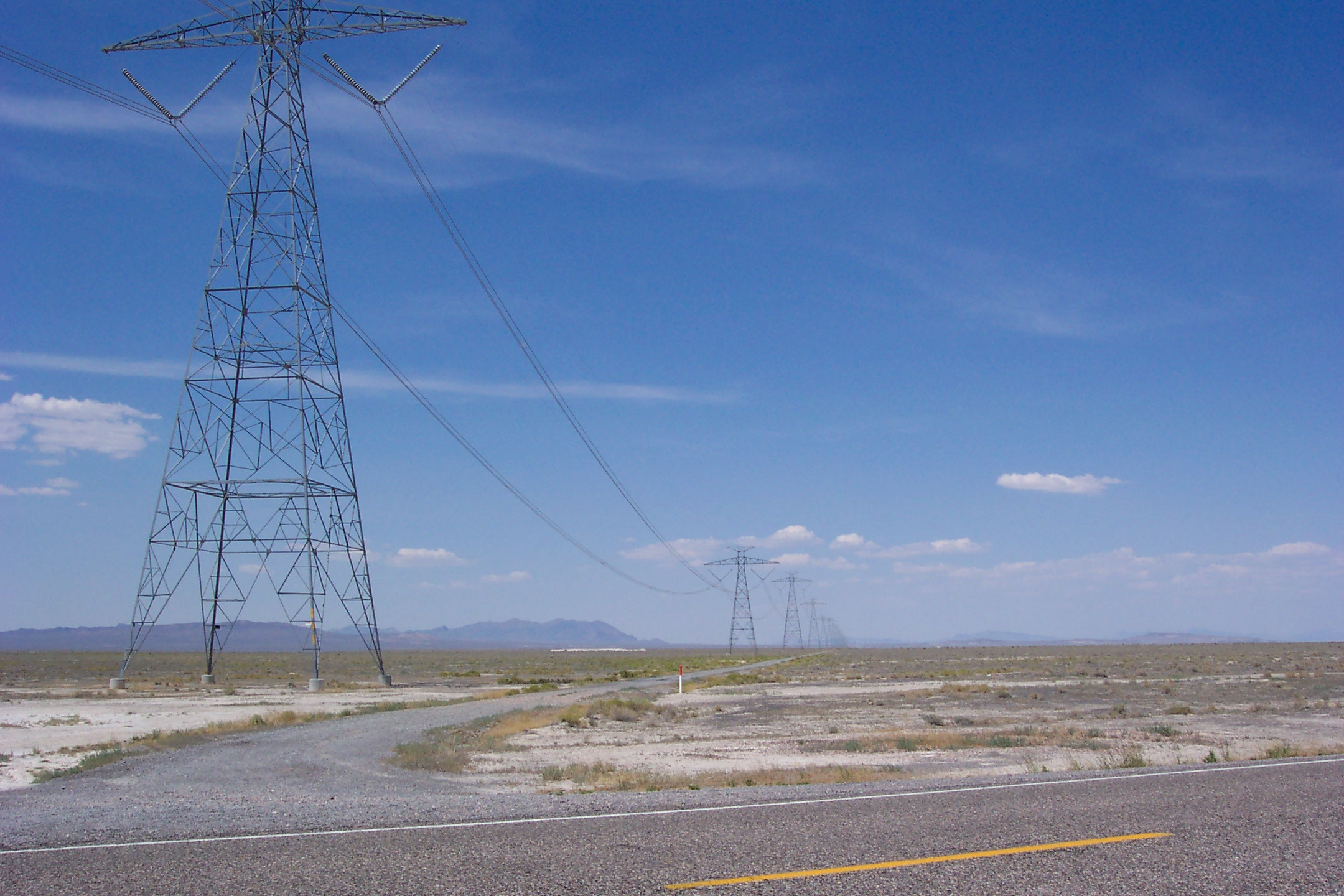
- Path 27 as seen on US 50 in Utah. An AC transmission line has since been built alongside this segment of the HVDC line.
- Map of Path 27

Location
- Country: United States
- State: Utah, Nevada, California
- General direction: Southwest
- From: Intermountain Power Plant near Delta, UT; 39°30′27″N 112°34′49″W
- Passes through: Southern Nevada
- To: Adelanto Converter Station in Adelanto, CA; 34°33′4″N 117°26′14″W

Ownership information
- Owner: Intermountain Power Agency (IPA)
- Operator: IPA

Construction information
- Substation manufacturer: Asea, (Note: ASEA and Brown, Boveri & Cie were merged to form ABB on January 1, 1988.); ABB (2011 upgrade)
- Construction started: May 1, 1984
- Construction cost: $1.1 billion
- Commissioned: September 16, 1985

Technical information
- Type: overhead transmission line
- Current type: high-voltage direct current
- Total length: 488 mi (785 km)
- Capacity: 2,400 MW
- DC voltage: ±500 kV (Note: The symbol ± denotes a dual voltage power supply for a bipolar system of 500,000 V and -500,000 V.)
- No. of poles: 2
- No. of circuits: 1
- Website: https://www.ipautah.com/

Path 27, also called the Intermountain (Note: More formally the Intermountain Power Project Direct Current (IPP DC) Line.) or the Southern Transmission System (STS), is a high-voltage direct current (HVDC) electrical transmission line running from the Intermountain Power Plant near Delta, Utah, to the Adelanto Converter Station at Adelanto, California, in the Southwestern United States. It was installed by Asea, a company based in Sweden, and commercialized in July 1986. The system is designed to carry power generated at the power plant in Utah to areas throughout Southern California. It is owned and operated by the Intermountain Power Agency, a cooperative consisting of six Los Angeles-area cities, the largest member being the Los Angeles Department of Water and Power (LADWP), and 29 smaller Utah municipalities.

Path 27 consists of an overhead power line 488 miles (785 km) long, (Note: The circuit length is twice the value at 976 miles (1,571 km).) and is capable of transferring up to 2,400 megawatts (MW) of power at ±500 kilovolts (kV), (Note: The American National Standards Institute (ANSI) classifies 500 kV as "extra-high voltage" along with 345 kV and 765 kV.) higher than the power plant's operational output of 1,900 MW. The resulting maximum current is 4,800 amperes. (Note: Calculated by: A = W ÷ V, where A = amperes, W = watts, and V = volts.) Given its length, a direct current (DC) is preferred to the more common alternating current (AC) as it allows the electrical energy to travel farther with minimal loss to resistance and requires no intermediate stations. It is bipolar, meaning that it has two conductors of opposite polarity (in place of three conductors for AC lines). Both conductors for the entire length are three cables bundled together; this is done to reduce the effects of EM interference and enhance the power line's performance. At each end of the line is a converter station that changes AC to DC on one side and back again on the other. Each terminus also features a dedicated ground which is connected by an electrode line to a grounding site away from the converters to provide ample earth return; this helps protect the main line and equipment from faults, and allows the system to operate at partial capacity when one conductor is out of service.

Sections of Path 27 are paralleled by other AC transmission lines, including some of 500 kV. The powerline is also visible from the Interstate 15 which it passes over multiple times. The HVDC line's converter stations will be replaced as part of a project to repurpose the Intermountain Power Plant as a hydrogen-burning facility. The stations are expected to go online by June 2026.

== Overview ==
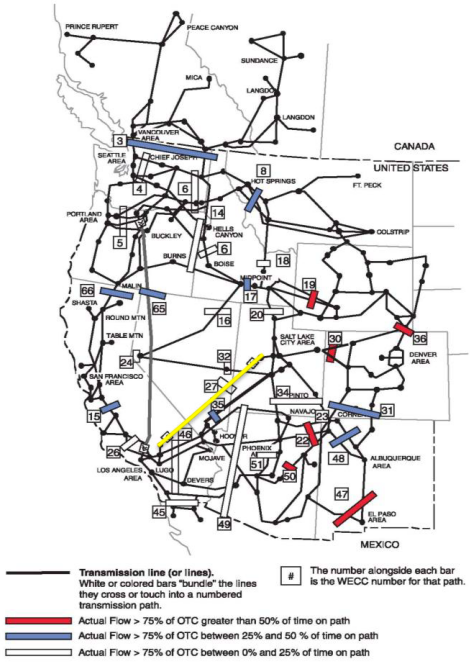
Rough chart of WECC's transmission grid, with Path 27 highlighted in yellow.

=== Background ===
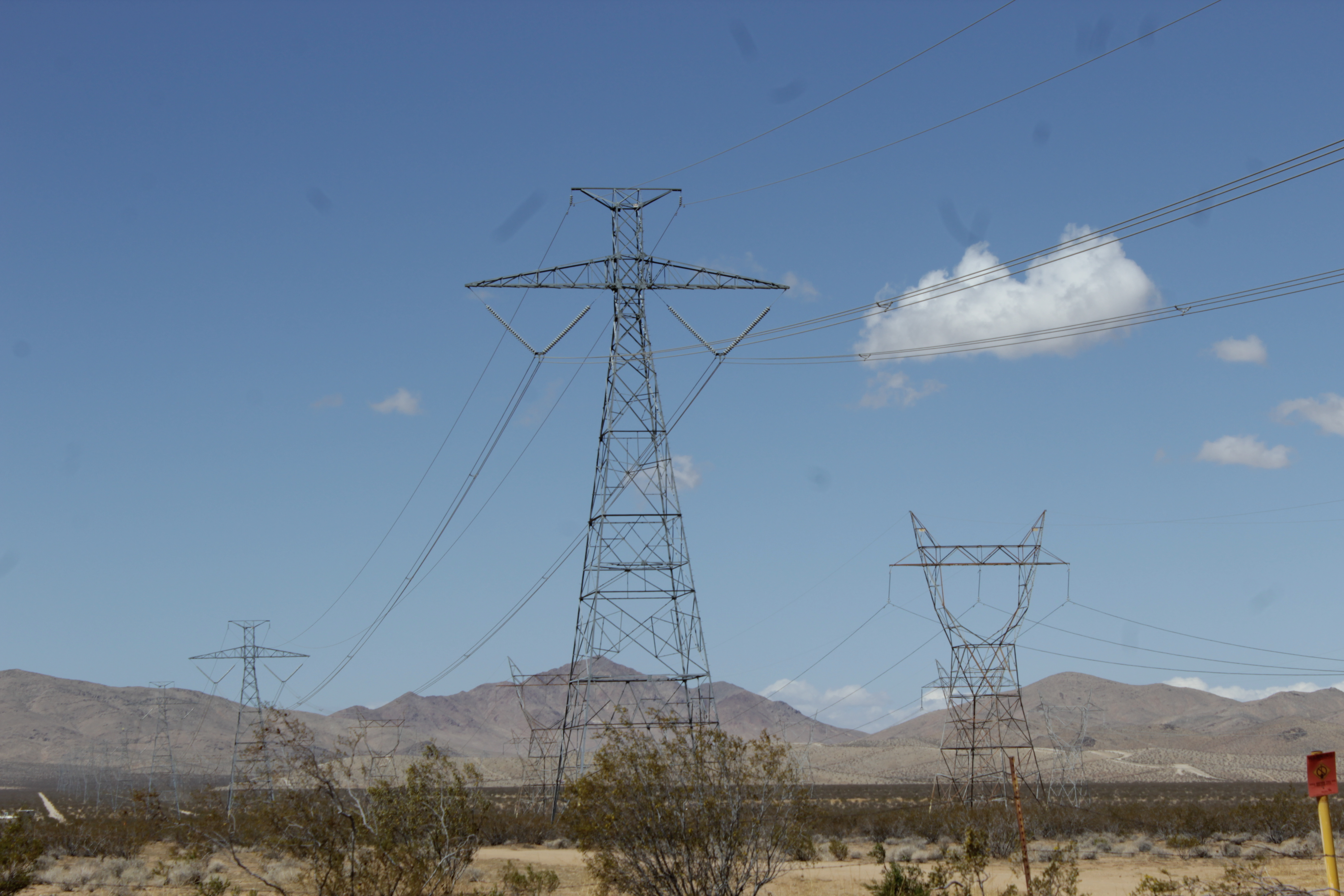
Path 27 may be identified by its uniquely-designed steel lattice pylons and two conductors. The tower's height, insulation, and separation of conductors and their thickness meet the specifics for a 500-kV circuit. Compare to a lower-voltage, conventional three-phase power line on the right.

High voltages are typically needed to convey large quantities of electrical power over a vast distance, while also minimizing the amount of energy lost to resistance in the conductive cables as a byproduct from a high current; that is, raising the voltage lowers the amperage for the circuit, according to Ohm's law. Whereas high-voltage transmission routes commonly employ a three-phase alternating current (AC) to move electricity in a to-and-fro fashion, high-voltage direct current (HVDC) lines, such as Path 27, carry power in only one direction. A direct current (DC) also incurs less loss of energy than AC over the same distance; in other words, DC can sustain power much further than AC, which may require intermediate stations, or "taps", along the route. Another disadvantage for AC is that power tends to flow on the outer layer of the conductor, a phenomenon called the skin effect. DC eschews this problem; it allows power to penetrate the entire thickness of the conductor for optimal capacity. Finally, DC circuitry has been chosen for Path 27 because the cost of transmitting power over its distance is lower than with AC, which is best economically suited for shorter stretches. (Note: From an investment standpoint, constructing overhead AC lines is cheaper than HVDC lines when the length is below 400 miles (600 km). Up to 500 miles (800 km) and beyond, however, makes HVDC a more attractive option. This range is called a "break-even distance." See also: AC network interconnectors.) HVDC is also cheaper because it utilizes fewer than three conductors, translating to less materials and subsequently allaying the cost of infrastructure and equipment used.

Asea, a multinational electrical supplier based in Sweden, managed the framework and supplies for Path 27, and was a chief contributor for the power line's installment. The number in "Path 27" is assigned by the Western Electricity Coordinating Council (WECC), which oversees the electrical transmission grid across the American West, to distinguish this line from the other critical transmission routes in the region. A 2010 report indicated that Path 27 was also the most congested electrical pathway within WECC's territory, though the system is able to handle such heavy usage.

Path 27 is owned and operated by an inter-municipal syndicate known as the Intermountain Power Agency (IPA), thus lending it the alternative name Intermountain. The IPA's roster includes 29 Utah municipalities (amidst them two suburbs of Salt Lake City, and Logan as the northernmost participant) and six Southern California cities. The cooperative was founded around this mission:

[Intermountain Power Agency’s mission] is to utilize its assets to provide reliable, economic and legally compliant energy products and services for the benefit of its Purchasers, members, and other stakeholders, which includes supplying a ready energy resource reserve and supporting direct and multiplier economic contributions to rural communities and the State. — IPA

Among its objectives is funneling excess energy to communities in Southern California; Path 27 was built to fulfill that purpose. The topmost SoCal client by population on the list is the Los Angeles Department of Water and Power (LADWP), the preeminent utility provider for Los Angeles, which also receives the greatest share of power through the plan ahead of Anaheim, Riverside, Pasadena, Burbank, and Glendale (as shown in the table below). Altogether, these members acquire the biggest proportion of energy under the IPA.

End-Users of Path 27 (based on net rating of 1,800 MW)
LADWP	48.617%
Anaheim	13.225%
Riverside	7.617%
Pasadena	4.409%
Burbank	3.371%
Glendale	1.704%
Total	78.943%
Source: Participants & Services

=== History ===
The earliest concept of Path 27 likely originated in 1973, in a decade when the U.S., along with much of North America, was in the throes of a debilitating energy crisis. During that year, after the U.S. Bureau of Reclamation warned of a forthcoming energy shortage, representatives for the Utah-based Intermountain Consumer Power Association (ICPA) convened with Southern California localities in a quest for newer power sources and for investors. The IPA was established in June 1977.

A crucial step for Path 27 came with the creation of the Intermountain Power Project (IPP) in 1974, which emerged as an initiative for financing the construction of a coal-fired generator, though it was not until 1977 that Utah's legislatures formally endorsed IPA's implementation of the project. (Note: In 1977, Governor Scott M. Matheson signed into law an amendment to the Utah Interlocal Cooperation Act aimed at streamlining the creation of IPA, which soon asserted control of the IPP in 1980.) Caineville in Wayne County, UT, was one of several locations suggested for the power plant, prior to settling upon the site north of Delta in Millard County, or west of Lynndyl as stated in the sanction. After clearing environmental checks, the generator broke ground on October 9, 1981, with $300 million in initial funds. (Note: The IPA requested an additional $900 million in 1983, one of the largest outlays by an inter-regional collateral in U.S. history.) The original plan called for four thermal units, each unit producing 750 MW, but it had decreased to two due to concerns over precipitous power demand. The generator's first unit was erected in 1983. The first batch of coal was delivered by train on July 2, 1985, and the first unit came online later that year. The second unit was actuated on June 13, 1987, bringing the plant to its fullest capacity of 1,500 MW. It would be bolstered to its present-day 1,900 MW productivity in 1989, hence rendering the electrical generator the largest in Utah by yield.

Transmission Line Completed On Time

Completing this large and complex project on schedule is a tribute to a productive work force and excellent contractors.

— Mike Pontius, Davis County Clipper

However, Path 27 fully materialized when the transmission line's construction commenced on May 1, 1984, and took slightly more than sixteen months to complete. (Note: Two HVDC lines had originally been slated, and the project would have allocated an estimated 24,400 acres of land, not counting access and service roads.) Various American contractors were commissioned for certain aspects and segments of the line. For instance, the Commonwealth Electric Company based in Marietta, Georgia, built 239 miles (385 km) of the line from Adelanto, California to Moapa, Nevada, while Irby Construction of Jacksonville, Mississippi, took on the remaining 250 miles (400 km) till Delta. But perhaps the most notable obligation for this turnkey project rested upon Asea, who imported the conductive cables and pieces for the galvanized steel-lattice support pylons to be assembled on the spot. One phase entailed the emplacement of the pylons' cement foundations, which are twenty feet (6.1 m) in average depth per pylon and vary in shape based on the tower's height and weight. Newspapers reported that rocky, jagged terrain often posed challenges for accessibility and had likely necessitated copious excavation and even dynamiting. In all, six hundred workers were deployed for the labor. The line achieved revenue service in July 1986 after the ignition of the power plant's first coal-burning unit, even though a document by LADWP attests that it might have been energized as early as December 1985. Depending on official tallies and news accounts, the total cost was $1.1 billion.

Finally yet equally integral for Path 27 are two converter stations (see below), which were inaugurated along with the transmission main, and are vital for its functionality. IPP's converter was installed in conjunction with the power generator, while the second converter in Adelanto and a tangent switchyard began rising on May 26, 1985, and finished in June 1986 in time to receive freshly-borne energy from borders over. LADWP supervised the construction of the combined facility and tasked Asea with the responsibility of the accouterments.

==== Later history ====
Since its inception, Path 27 saw upgrades and refinements around the latter turn of the century—the IPP's latest proliferation included. At the behest of LADWP and Southern California Edison, ABB Group and Hitachi Energy modernized the transmission line in 2008 and 2011, respectively, with improved control and protection technology (Note: Hardware in place is by MACH2.) alongside supplemental filters and cooling systems at each terminal. This helped raise the power line's capacity to its modern-day level of 2,400 MW.

== Installation ==
Path 27 is best illustrated in this simplified block diagram of a bipolar HVDC system.

=== Transmission ===
The primary component of Path 27 is the transmission line itself, which is constructed entirely aboveground on a length of 488 miles (785 km) through southwestern Utah, southern Nevada, and southern California. As opposed to three phases, Path 27 has two poles; one positive (cathode) and another negative (anode); making this a bipolar configuration. It exerts 500 kV per pole, or 1,000 kV total, and is rated for 2,400 MW, giving it a maximum current rating of 4,800 amperes. By comparison, the Intermountain Power Plant (IPP) generates up to 1,900 MW, thus adding to the line's fault tolerance. On most HVDC systems, power can be sent in either direction; Path 27 transports electricity from Utah to California under normal circumstances.

Any conductive material engenders electromagnetic radiation whenever electricity flows through it. A single cable carrying such high voltage would produce particularly strong radiation in the form of a corona discharge that can deprive electrical energy and cause EM interference on radio and communication devices. For this reason, Path 27's conductors comprise three cables fastened together, or are triple-bundled. This not only reduces the detrimental effects of discharge, it also provides more surface area for power to flow, thereby improving transmission efficiency. Each cable is made of aluminium strands enveloping a steel core for strength and durability, and the composite measures 1.8 inches (46 mm) in breadth.

Two shield wires are mounted above the main conductors and shared by the same support pylons. These wires guard the power line against lightning strikes. (Note: Lightning storms frequently take place between July and August in parts of the Mojave Desert that Path 27 traverses. This weather pattern is due to moist air migrating from Baja California during the monsoon season.)

=== Converters ===
Both sides of Path 27 feature a converter station, which bridges electrical power between AC and DC circuitry and is ubiquitous to HVDC projects worldwide. The converters are located at the IPP station north of Delta, UT, and the Adelanto Converter Station in Adelanto, north of San Bernardino, CA.

Path 27's terminals
(Power moves from left to right of gallery)
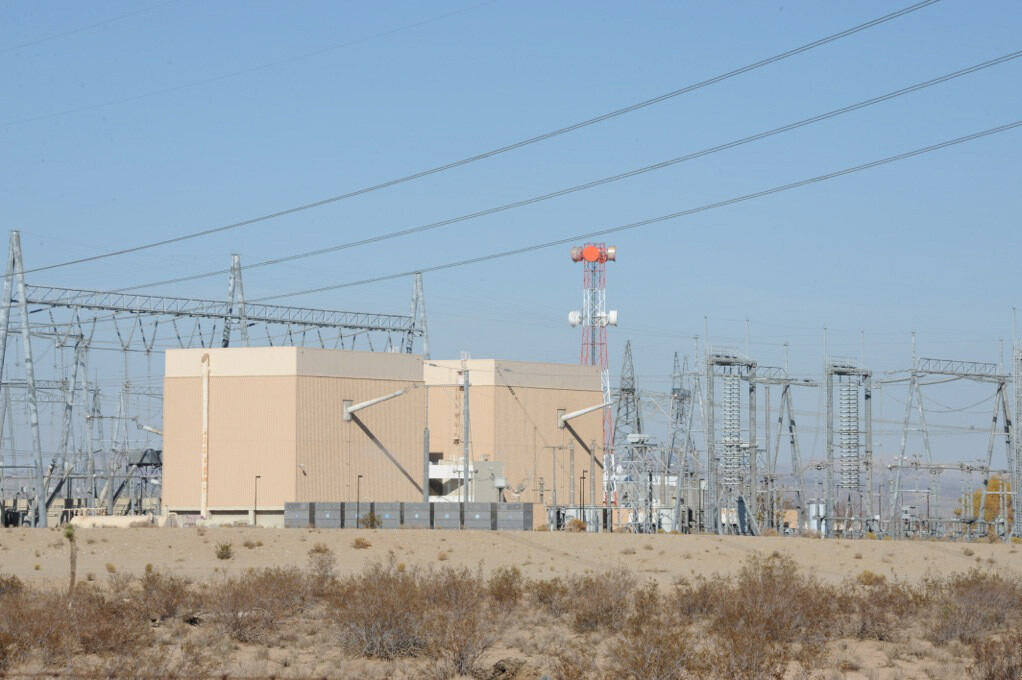
The Adelanto Converter Station is the end point of the HVDC line.

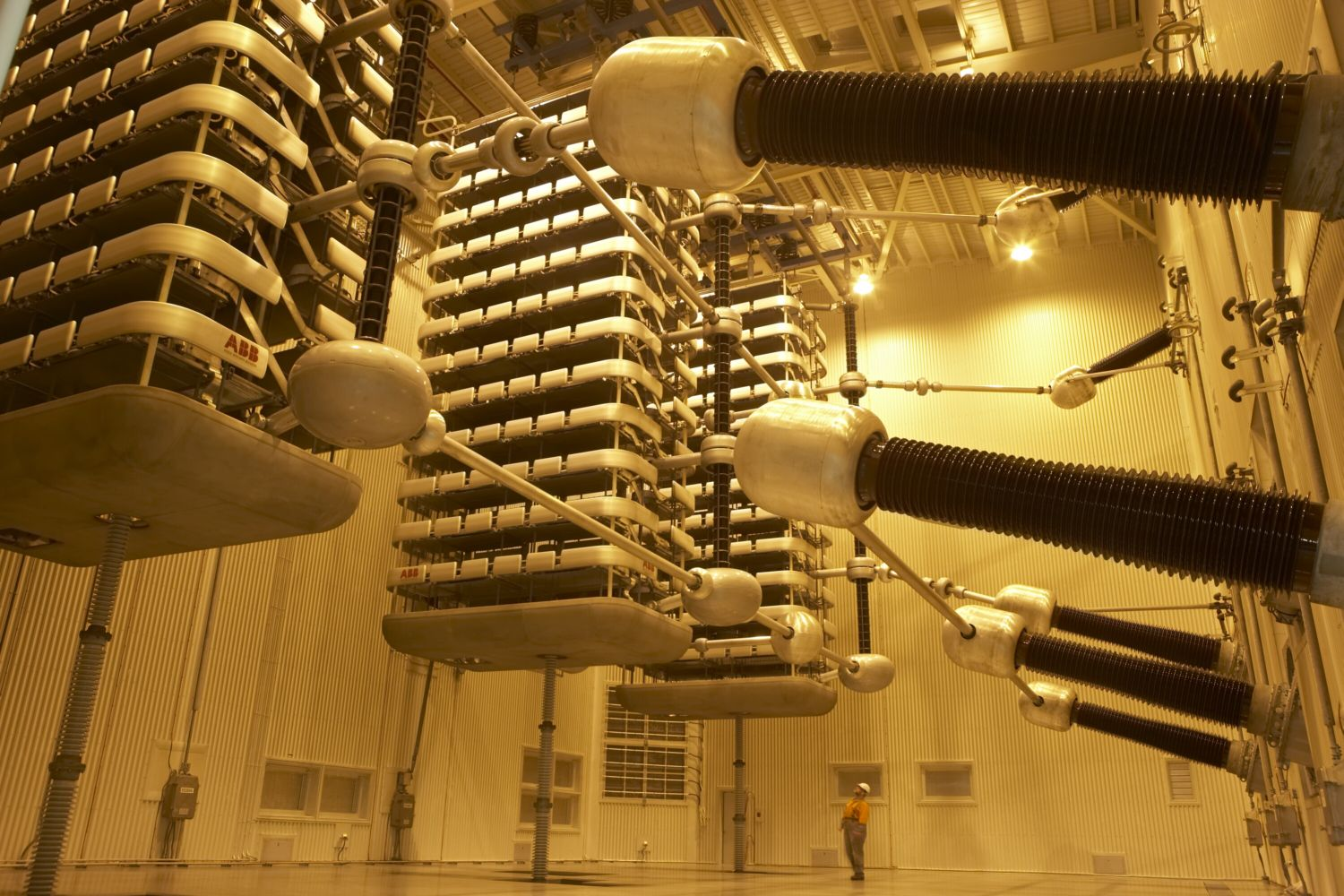
Path 27 uses stacks of thyristor valves similar to these on the HVDC Inter-Island in New Zealand. Note the person for scale.

The heart of the conversion process transpires in clusters of electronic valves that procedurally modify the flow of electricity in a manner similar to switches. The type of valves on Path 27 is thyristor, technology popular in HVDC since the late 1960s. The valve configuration is identical for both converters: 24 stacks about 50 feet (15 m) in height of 24 valves apiece (or three "quadruple-valves"), organized into twelve modules—a single valve contains 144 thyristors. (Note: That amounts to 165,888 thyristors for Path 27.) As a matter of redundancy, the valves at both terminals are grouped two by six; should one be disabled, the other can pick up the slack above its designated capacity for a limited duration. The entire assemblage is housed in a hangar-like enclosure called a valve hall that protects it from the weather and airborne dust. The valves are affixed on tall insulators that separate them from the interior walls, floor, and ceiling; done to hinder induction and premature grounding, as well as aid cooling. Path 27's valve halls are also fortified against earthquakes.

As the IPP converter is adjacent to the power plant, electricity is generally fed into the HVDC line from this terminus. Ingress for power to the system is preceded by a row of transformers that step up the voltage level to 500 kV. Next, it infiltrates the valve hall through enormous bushings that protect the building from damage caused by arcing. Inside the hall, the valves pipe the electrical flow from AC to DC in a complex process called rectification. (Note: This process is found in most rechargeable battery appliances.) On the DC circuitry back outside sits a sequence of filters and reactors that reciprocally smooth out the DC supply and serve to cushion the facility from disturbances as a result of power surges. The electricity is then sent on its way down Path 27.

The Adelanto Converter Station demarks the receiving end of the HVDC line and has relatively the same layout, but the conversion process is reversed. Beyond another set of reactors and filters, the inpouring power enters the valve hall to be carried over to AC circuitry anew—this is inversion, (Note: The inverter on a solar power system uses this process.) and it blocks any power backflow on the AC conduit from reaching the valves to enforce unidirectional movement. The electricity advances through a second tier of transformers before disemboguing onto diverging AC lines to be dispersed across the vicinity. (Note: Adelanto's converter connects to a 500-kV bank, so the transformers here merely act as a buffer against overvoltages. They are reputedly the largest ever manufactured to the U.S. by ABB Group.)

Ideally, Path 27 can work in the opposite direction, with the Adelanto terminal becoming a rectifier, and the IPP an inverter, but given practical reasons that seldom happens on this particular system.

=== Grounding system ===
Like any HVDC scheme, Path 27 needs to be grounded at both ends so that each pole will operate with respect to the earth. Grounding provides the electric current a common path back into the earth, which serves as a neutral point for the circuit.

Even with safeguards and a substantive fault tolerance, failures on the line can and do occur, thence grounding becomes a workaround for continued reliability of the system. If one pole develops a fault, its current is diverted via the ground return to complete the circuit. This de-energizes the problem conductor, while the second pole remains active as normal. In technical terms, grounding allows the power line to function as a monopole instead of a bipole. However, it halves the line's overall capacity. A pole may also be taken offline by the same means for maintenance, ensuring the safety of work crews. This contingency precludes the need to shut down the whole HVDC system and interrupt the power source, yet it is temporary, as the earth return on a bipolar system is not intended for prolonged use.

HVDC exhibits significant potential such that the converter's onsite grounding devices are not enough to withstand alone, and a return current would otherwise cause issues at the electrical facility including rapid metal corrosion, so the grounding nodes are set at remote locations. On Path 27, the IPP converter's grounding point is situated about 22.2 miles (35.7 km) southwest of the valves (here), while the Adelanto converter's lies about 53.85 miles (86.66 km) to the northeast (here) on the edge of a playa known as Coyote Lake. (Note: By comparison, that grounding site is about 21 miles (34 km) east-northeast of central Barstow.) These spots were chosen in part for high conductivity within the earthen minerals. Each node covers an area of approximately 0.25 square miles (0.65 km^{2}).

At each grounding point is an array of buried conductive rods that form an electrode, marking the actual transition point into the earth for the current. Within the electrodes for Path 27 are sixty rods (Note: The rods themselves are elements divided into segments interlaced with smaller cables. This allows the elements to expand and contract.) arranged in a circular rim about 3,000 feet (910 metres) in diameter and spaced evenly for the best result. Each rod is placed vertically to reach subterranean layers with the least resistivity possible: IPP's electrode rods are 285 feet (87 metres) deep, and Adelanto's extend 200 feet (60 metres) downward. The rods are individually encased in a perforated-metal tube, or a "well", to retard corrosion. The wells are filled with petroleum coke to enhance the current's connectivity into the soil. Additionally, the coke regulates heat that the rod naturally emits when a current is induced; this is to mitigate the electrode's impact on the surrounding environment. A series of jumper cables radiating from the center of the circle feed the return current into the rods. At the center is a small structure perched on the surface called a terminal house, which is also equipped with a transmitter that helps technicians monitor the electrode's performance. The circular "deep-well" setup of Path 27's electrodes is a variation of the "ring-style" electrode found on other HVDC projects such as the Nelson River Transmission System in Canada.

The converters are linked to the electrodes by a pair of conductive cables, each measuring 1.407 square inches (908 mm^{2}) in thickness, to enable physical contact with the earth. These are the electrode lines, arteries for the return current. More precisely, the electrode line carries the current to the terminal house which then injects it through the electrode. Starting at both termini, the electrode line runs atop Path 27's main pylons in lieu of shield wires before branching off along a standalone set of steel utility poles. Steel poles have been selected for their resiliency in the hot, arid locales. The electrode line for the IPP converter has a total length of 30 miles (48 km), and the Adelanto's extends 59 miles (95 km). Uniquely, Adelanto's electrode line travels underground for its final two miles (3.2 km) approximately till the grounding site.

The electrodes and electrode lines are distinct from the metallic return, which would involve an extra third conductor along the span of Path 27—the former HVDC Vancouver Island being an example. Such method would likely be infeasible for its scope and magnitude.

== Route ==
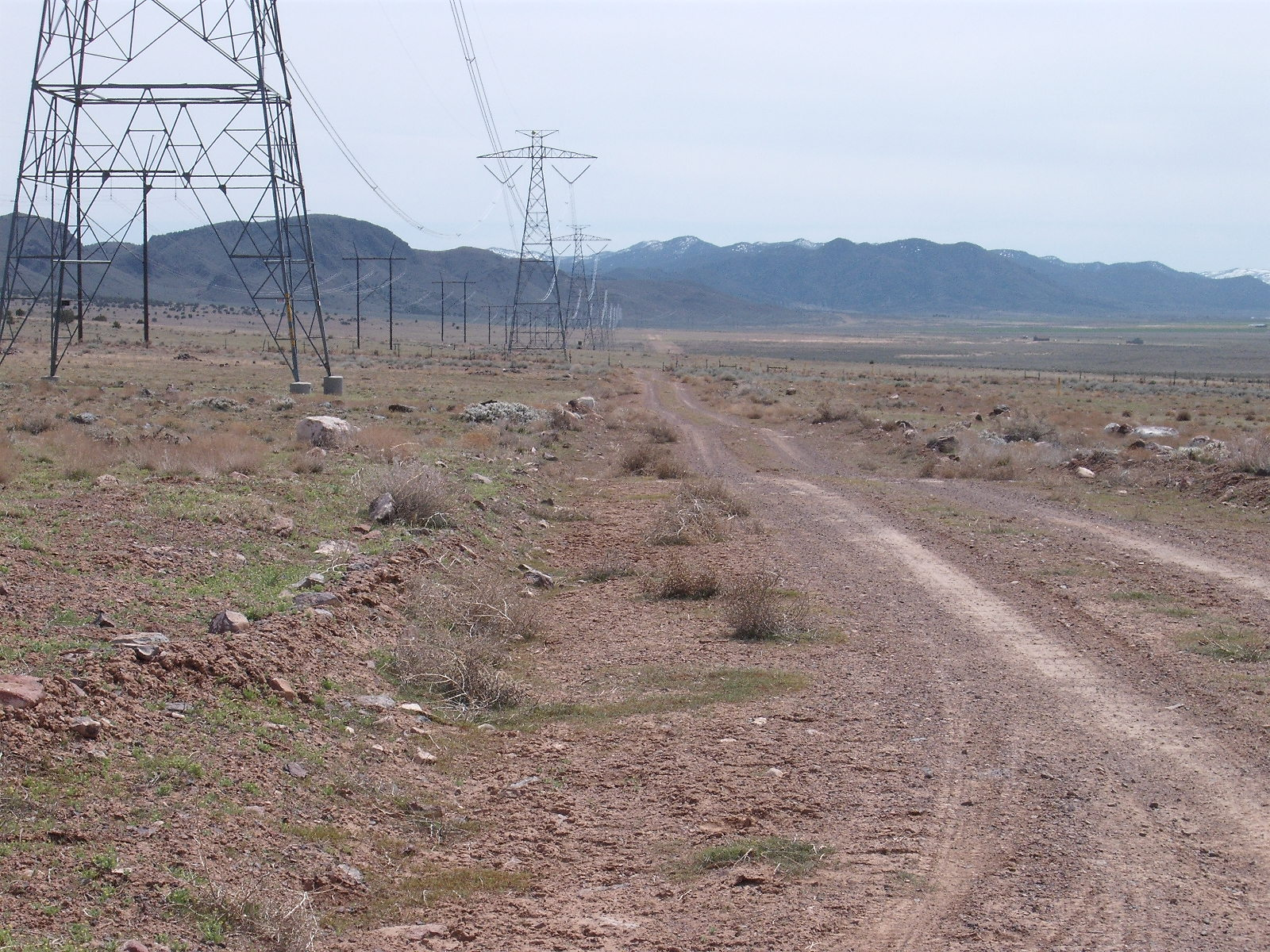
The Old Spanish Trail meanders beneath Path 27 in Utah.

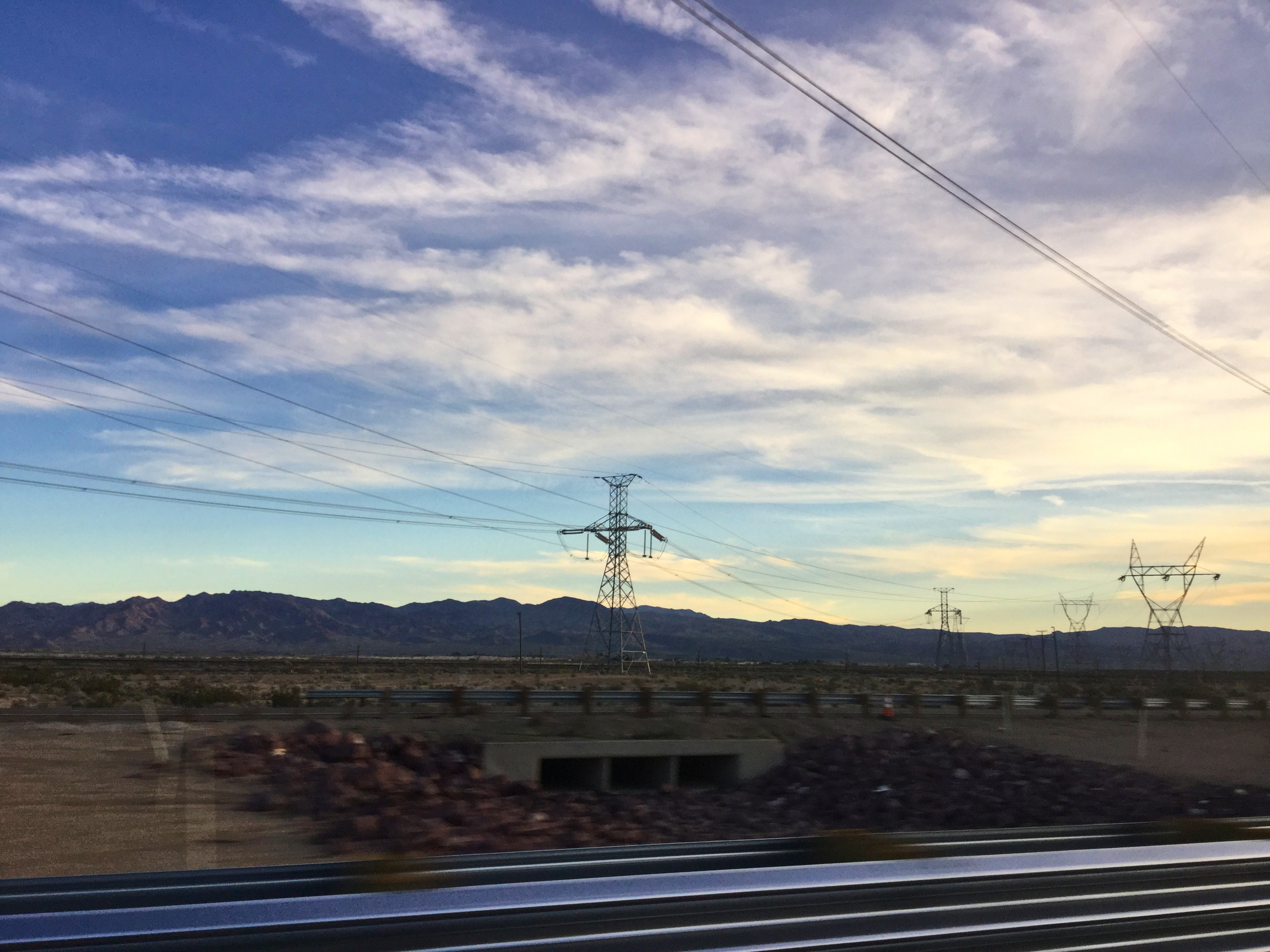
Path 27 crossing Interstate 15 outside Yermo, CA. Three electrical lines of various voltages parallel this leg of the HVDC line.

Following the regular power flow, Path 27 begins at the Intermountain Power Plant in Utah and heads briefly west before curving southward, passing over the US 50/US 6 duplex west of Hinkley. The DC line ventures through legions of dry basins and high mountains in the state due southwest; all the while crossing Utah Routes 21, 56, and 18; before reaching Nevada about 5.5 miles (8.9 km) north of Arizona's northwestern corner, simultaneously entering the Mojave Desert.

Inside Nevada, Path 27 traverses the Mormon Mesa, bypassing Glendale and crossing the Muddy River. It bisects the Moapa River Indigenous Reservation lands before crossing Interstate 15 near Crystal. Across Las Vegas Valley, the line meets with NV 564 while riding through the Frenchman Mountain, straddles the River Mountains outside Henderson, and crosses Interstate 11 at Railroad Pass before heading into Eldorado Valley. Upon traversing the McCullough Range, it descends into Ivanpah Valley, missing Primm in its north and crossing Interstate 15 again. Shortly thereafter, it enters California.

Path 27 cuts across isolated, oft-rugged tracts of the High Desert while also encountering CA 127 north of Baker. Now in the Inland Empire, the line proceeds through Victor Valley where it crosses Interstate 15 once more near Yermo, as well as old US 66 and Interstate 40 between Daggett and Newberry Springs. It then encounters CA 247 south of Barstow. Around Bell Mountain, Path 27 meets with Interstate 15 one last time, and then old US 66 a second instance and US 395 near Oro Grande before reaching Adelanto, where the line arrives at its final destination of the Adelanto Converter Station.

Numerous AC transmission lines parallel Path 27 throughout its course. A 345 kV circuit runs beside the DC line interlinking the IPP and a wind farm near Milford. A second 345 kV circuit leading to the Harry Allen Generating Station joins Path 27 near Cedar City. North of Mesquite, both are joined by a 500 kV line connecting the decommissioned Navajo Generating Station; the three travel somewhat within eyeshot of Interstate 15 until a solar park near Crystal. An assortment of 500 kV transmission corridors then follow Path 27 through Las Vegas Valley toward another collection of solar farms outside Boulder City. From Ivanpah Valley onward, two more 500 kV circuits and a third of 287 kV accompany Path 27 across the desert—these three constitute WECC Path 46. By Victorville, Path 27 splits from the three AC routes but is once again shadowed by others of various voltages before culminating in Adelanto. Stringing multiple circuits on the same right-of-way is often favored, as it consumes less land per mile.

== Future ==
The coal-firing powerhouses at the IPP site are to be retired by 2027. This adheres to LADWP's wishes for reducing its dependence on fossil fuels in favor of greener energy. In a renewal project announced by LADWP, the plant will be replaced with a gas-powered facility specially tailored for harvesting hydrogen by 2025, and paired with at least two solar farms on nearby parcels. The sources will beget 840 MW and 300 MW at peak, respectively, or 1,140 MW when combined, still lower than Path 27's maximal capacity. The renewal project also calls for both converter stations to be replaced and activated by June 2026, as well as improvements to Path 27 to lengthen the power line's service life.

== See also ==
- Pacific DC Intertie - a similar HVDC system running through the Western U.S.
- List of HVDC projects
