= Adelanto Converter Station =

Converter station in California, United States

Coordinates: 34°33′4″N 117°26′14″W

Adelanto Converter Station in Adelanto, California, is the southern terminus of the 2,400 MW Path 27 Utah–California high voltage DC power (HVDC) transmission line. The station contains redundant thyristor-based HVDC converters rated for 1,200 MW continuous or 1,600 MW short term overload. The 300-acre (120 ha) station was completed in July, 1986 at a cost of US$131 million. The northern terminus of Path 27 is fossil fueled Intermountain Power Plant in Utah.

An adjacent $45 million AC switching station owned by Los Angeles Department of Water and Power links to the Southern California grid via five 500-kV AC lines.

ABB, who had built the station in 1986, upgraded its original 1,600 MW capacity to 2,400 MW in 2011.

In 2012, an 11.4 MW solar array (less than 1% of the Utah plant's capacity) was installed at the facility at a cost of $48 million obtained with loans subsidized by the American Recovery and Reinvestment Act of 2009.

== Interconnects ==
Adelanto substation is connected to the following via 500 kV AC lines:

- Marketplace substation in Nevada via Path 64
- Victorville Switching Station (two lines)
- RS-E (Toluca) in the eastern San Fernando Valley
- RS-Rinaldi in the northern San Fernando Valley
