= Delta, Utah =

City in Utah, United States

- City
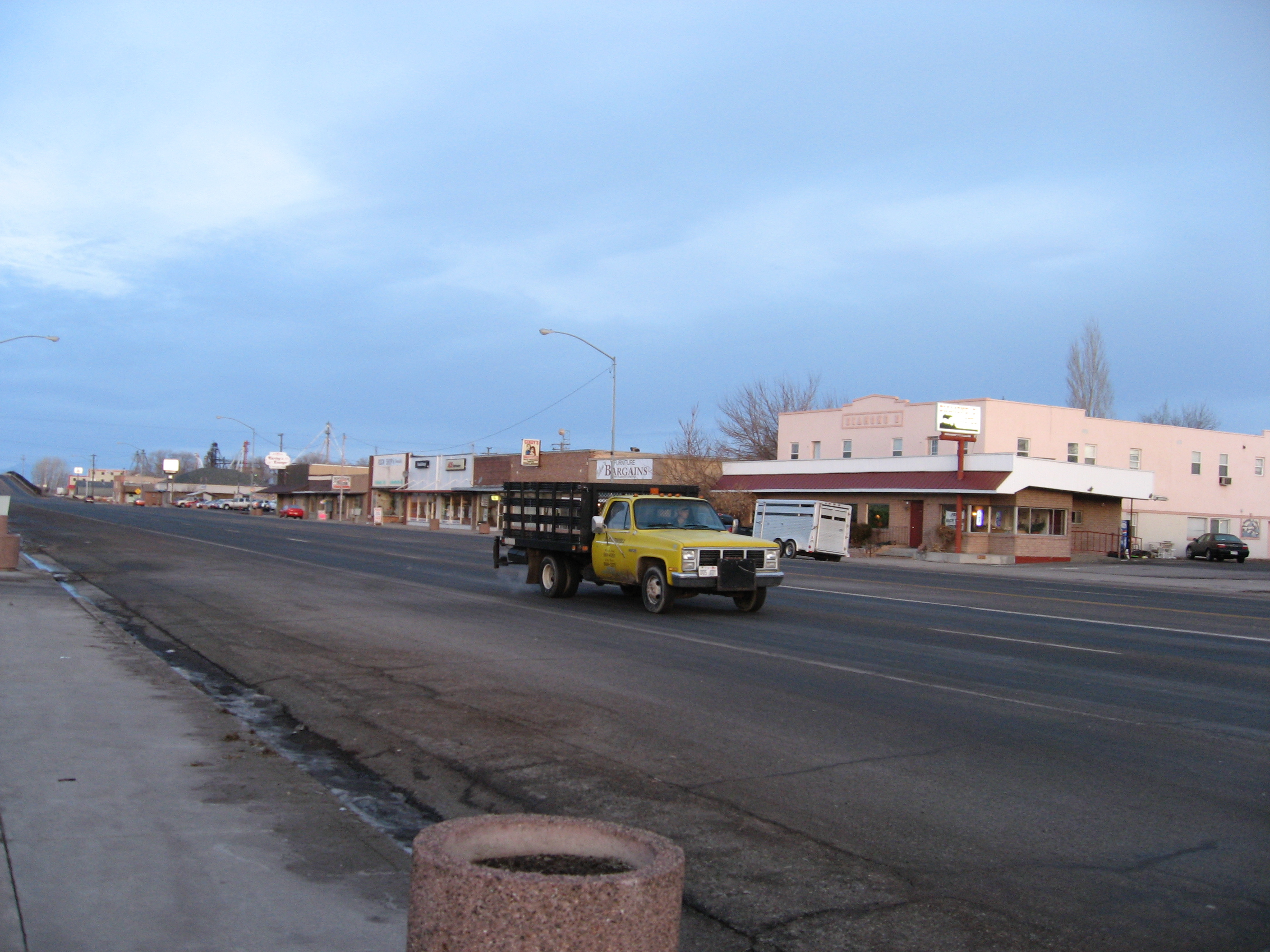

- Location in Millard County and the state of Utah.
- Coordinates: 39°21′11″N 112°34′25″W
- Country: United States
- State: Utah
- County: Millard
- Settled: 1906
- Named for: Delta of the Sevier River

Area
  - Total: 8.61 sq mi (22.31 km^{2})
  - Land: 8.49 sq mi (22.00 km^{2})
  - Water: 0.12 sq mi (0.31 km^{2})
- Elevation: 4,639 ft (1,414 m)

Population (2020)
  - Total: 3,622
  - Density: 426.4/sq mi (164.6/km^{2})
- Time zone: UTC-7 (Mountain (MST))
  - Summer (DST): UTC-6 (MDT)
- ZIP code: 84624
- Area code: 435
- FIPS code: 49-18910
- GNIS feature ID: 2410320
- Website: http://www.delta.utah.gov/

Delta is the largest city in Millard County, Utah, United States. It is located in the northeastern area of Millard County along the Sevier River and is surrounded by farmland. The population was 3,622 at the 2020 census.

== History ==
Delta was originally a railroad switch called Aiken. In 1905 Aiken was renamed Melville when Millard County began plans to set up irrigation and a dam. People purchased land for 50 cents an acre as long as they agreed to develop a 40-acre lot. The name was changed again because of the similarities between Melville and Millville, another town in Utah. The name was changed on 12 May 1908 to Burtner. The name was finally changed to Delta on May 11, 1911. The name was chosen as the area was a delta of the Sevier River.

=== Topaz Relocation Camp ===
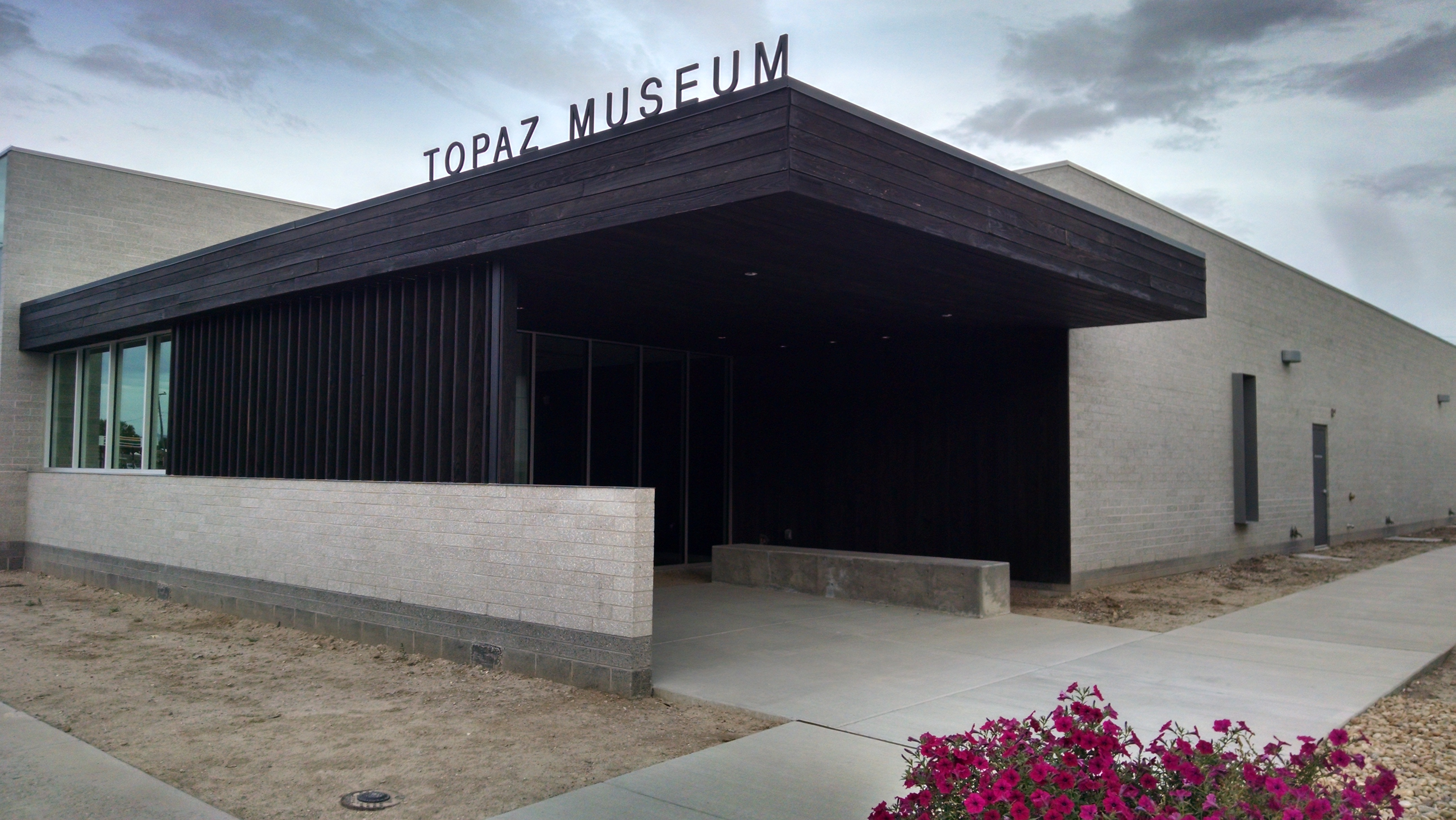
Topaz Museum in Delta, Utah

During World War II, after the attack on Pearl Harbor, tens of thousands of Japanese-Americans were gathered up and placed in 10 incarceration camps to protect military installations from espionage. One of these camps, then called Central Utah Relocation Center, was located near Delta and filled with former residents of the San Francisco Bay Area.

The Topaz Museum, located in Delta, works to preserve important sites at the relocation center and to provide information on the history of the camps.

=== Great Basin Museum ===
A history of the area is kept and displayed at The Great Basin Museum.

=== Gunnison Massacre Site ===
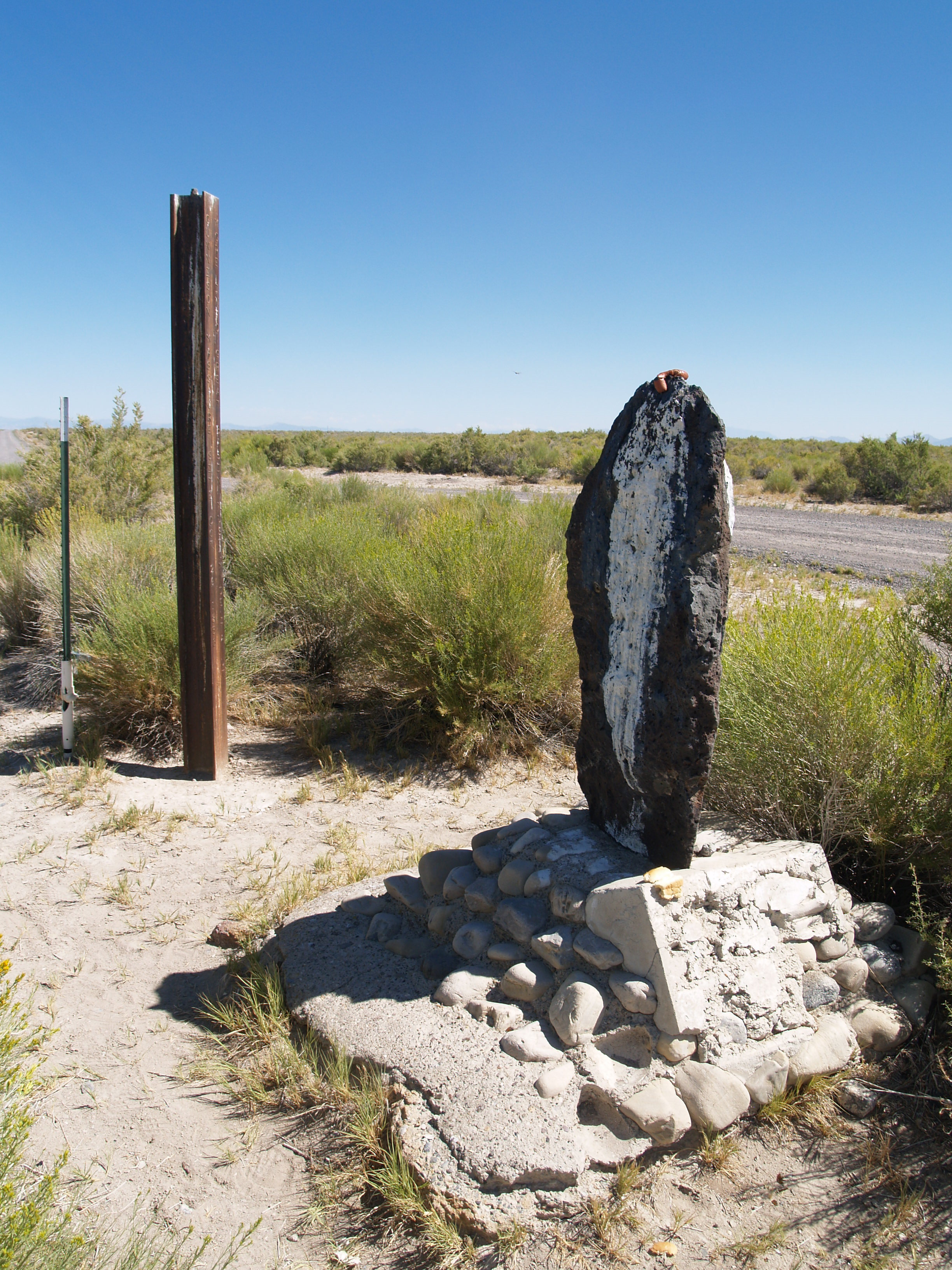
Two markers at the Gunnison site, 2008

John Williams Gunnison was leading a federal surveying team near the Sevier Lake. He was ambushed by the Pahvant Indians and killed.

== Geography ==
According to the United States Census Bureau, the city has a total area of 3.2 square miles or 8.3 square kilometres, all land.

=== Climate ===
Delta experiences a cold semi-arid climate (Köppen BSk) with hot summers and cold winters. Because of Delta's altitude and aridity, temperatures drop quickly after sunset, especially in the summer. Winters are cold. Daytime highs in the winter are usually above freezing, but nighttime lows drop well below freezing, occasionally falling below 0 °F or −17.8 °C. Delta's climate is similar to that of Salt Lake City, but much more arid.

Climate data for Delta, Utah, 1991–2020 normals, extremes 1965–present
Month	Jan	Feb	Mar	Apr	May	Jun	Jul	Aug	Sep	Oct	Nov	Dec	Year
Record high °F (°C)	64 (18)	74 (23)	86 (30)	94 (34)	103 (39)	107 (42)	110 (43)	106 (41)	106 (41)	92 (33)	79 (26)	70 (21)	110 (43)
Mean maximum °F (°C)	53.6 (12.0)	62.6 (17.0)	75.7 (24.3)	83.2 (28.4)	91.1 (32.8)	100.1 (37.8)	104.2 (40.1)	101.7 (38.7)	95.4 (35.2)	85.4 (29.7)	68.6 (20.3)	57.4 (14.1)	104.5 (40.3)
Mean daily maximum °F (°C)	39.1 (3.9)	46.5 (8.1)	58.0 (14.4)	64.9 (18.3)	75.5 (24.2)	86.7 (30.4)	95.1 (35.1)	92.9 (33.8)	82.2 (27.9)	67.5 (19.7)	51.4 (10.8)	39.4 (4.1)	66.6 (19.2)
Daily mean °F (°C)	27.4 (−2.6)	33.5 (0.8)	42.6 (5.9)	48.8 (9.3)	58.2 (14.6)	68.0 (20.0)	76.2 (24.6)	74.2 (23.4)	63.9 (17.7)	50.4 (10.2)	37.1 (2.8)	27.1 (−2.7)	50.6 (10.3)
Mean daily minimum °F (°C)	15.7 (−9.1)	20.6 (−6.3)	27.1 (−2.7)	32.6 (0.3)	40.9 (4.9)	49.3 (9.6)	57.4 (14.1)	55.6 (13.1)	45.6 (7.6)	33.4 (0.8)	22.8 (−5.1)	14.8 (−9.6)	34.7 (1.5)
Mean minimum °F (°C)	−3.1 (−19.5)	2.6 (−16.3)	13.7 (−10.2)	18.8 (−7.3)	26.9 (−2.8)	35.2 (1.8)	46.1 (7.8)	45.1 (7.3)	30.2 (−1.0)	18.4 (−7.6)	5.2 (−14.9)	−3.3 (−19.6)	−8.4 (−22.4)
Record low °F (°C)	−25 (−32)	−27 (−33)	−8 (−22)	12 (−11)	15 (−9)	25 (−4)	37 (3)	35 (2)	21 (−6)	−2 (−19)	−13 (−25)	−30 (−34)	−30 (−34)
Average precipitation inches (mm)	0.63 (16)	0.64 (16)	0.80 (20)	0.94 (24)	0.92 (23)	0.48 (12)	0.35 (8.9)	0.54 (14)	0.71 (18)	0.91 (23)	0.50 (13)	0.59 (15)	8.01 (203)
Average snowfall inches (cm)	5.5 (14)	5.3 (13)	3.9 (9.9)	2.2 (5.6)	0.0 (0.0)	0.0 (0.0)	0.0 (0.0)	0.0 (0.0)	0.0 (0.0)	0.8 (2.0)	3.2 (8.1)	4.4 (11)	25.3 (64)
Average precipitation days (≥ 0.01 in)	5.6	6.0	5.9	6.3	6.1	3.3	3.5	4.5	4.4	4.8	4.3	5.4	60.1
Average snowy days (≥ 0.1 in)	3.3	3.2	2.2	1.5	0.0	0.0	0.0	0.0	0.0	0.4	1.9	3.5	16.0
Source: NOAA

=== Sevier River and Lake ===
The Sevier River flows near Delta. The Sevier River is generally used for irrigation before it reaches its eventual end, the dry Sevier Lake.

=== DMAD ===
DMAD is the initials for the Deseret Melville Abraham and Delta water company.

Just upstream of Delta, the Sevier River is dammed to provide irrigation water, reservoir storage, and cooling water for IPP Intermountain Power Project. This reservoir is referred to as the DMAD.

Agriculture is a major economic force in Delta and the Sevier valley.

=== Gunnison Bend Reservoir ===
Downstream of Delta, the Sevier River is dammed again for irrigation and reservoir storage. This reservoir is named Gunnison Bend Reservoir in honor of John Williams Gunnison.

== Demographics ==
Historical population
Census	Pop.	Note	%±
1910	459		—
1920	939		104.6%
1930	1,183		26.0%
1940	1,304		10.2%
1950	1,703		30.6%
1960	1,576		−7.5%
1970	1,610		2.2%
1980	1,930		19.9%
1990	2,998		55.3%
2000	3,209		7.0%
2010	3,436		7.1%
2020	3,622		5.4%
U.S. Decennial Census

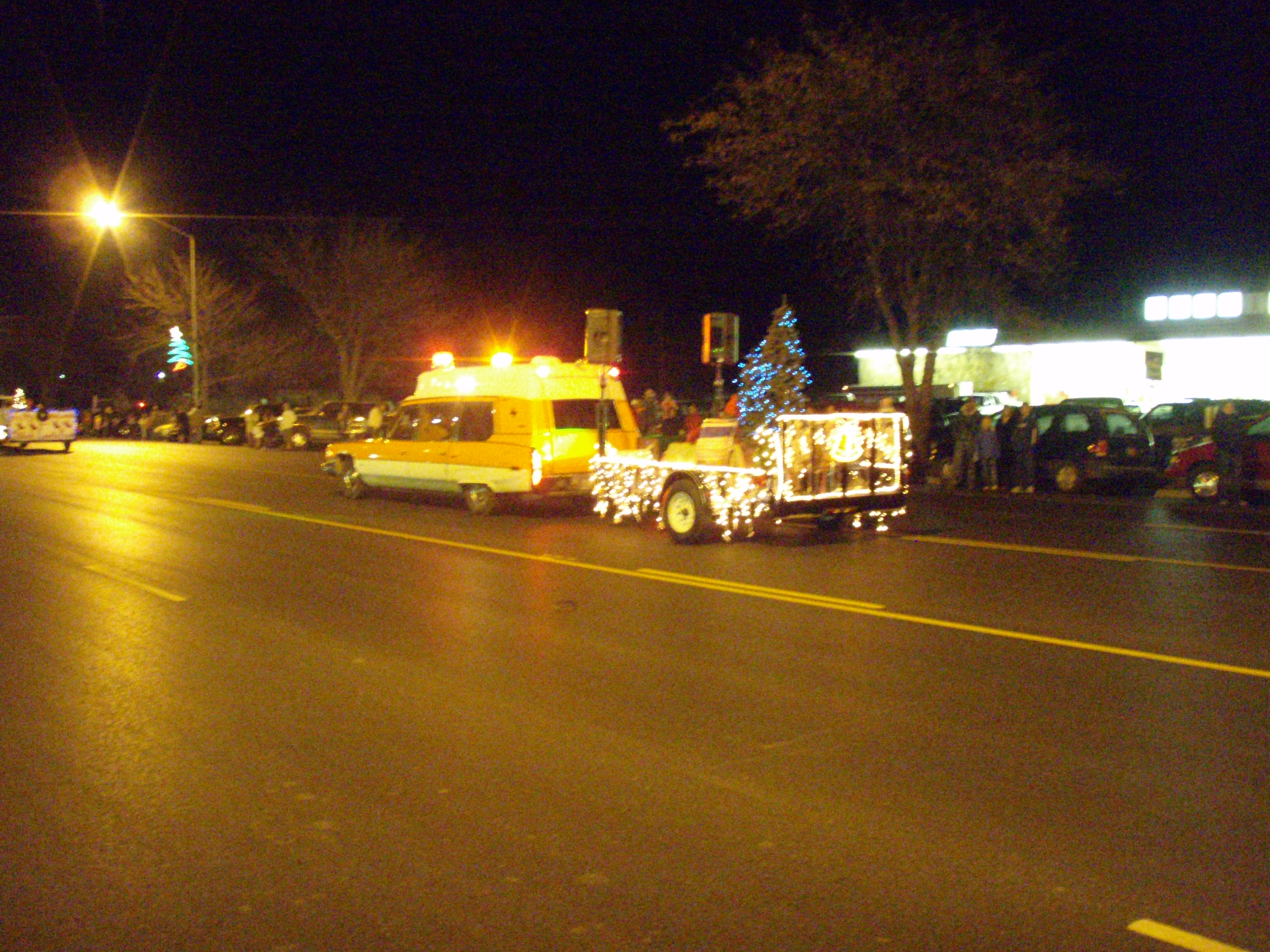
Christmas Parade in Delta (2007)

=== 2020 census ===
As of the 2020 census, Delta had a population of 3,622. The median age was 33.1 years; 34.3% of residents were under the age of 18 and 14.4% were 65 years of age or older. For every 100 females there were 104.6 males, and for every 100 females age 18 and over there were 98.4 males.

0.0% of residents lived in urban areas, while 100.0% lived in rural areas.

There were 1,158 households in Delta, of which 42.6% had children under the age of 18 living in them. Of all households, 60.3% were married-couple households, 15.2% were households with a male householder and no spouse or partner present, and 20.9% were households with a female householder and no spouse or partner present. About 21.3% of all households were made up of individuals and 9.2% had someone living alone who was 65 years of age or older.

There were 1,278 housing units, of which 9.4% were vacant. The homeowner vacancy rate was 1.5% and the rental vacancy rate was 9.2%.

Racial composition as of the 2020 census
Race	Number	Percent
White	2,818	77.8%
Black or African American	5	0.1%
American Indian and Alaska Native	34	0.9%
Asian	25	0.7%
Native Hawaiian and Other Pacific Islander	4	0.1%
Some other race	537	14.8%
Two or more races	199	5.5%
Hispanic or Latino (of any race)	761	21.0%

=== 2000 census ===
As of the census of 2000, there were 3,209 people, 1,006 households, and 780 families residing in the city. The population density was 1,018.3 people per square mile (393.3/km^{2}). There were 1,106 housing units at an average density of 351.0 per square mile (135.6/km^{2}). The racial makeup of the city was 94.61% White, 0.06% African American, 0.97% Native American, 0.12% Asian, 0.28% Pacific Islander, 3.15% from other races, and 0.81% from two or more races. Hispanic or Latino of any race were 10.10% of the population.

There were 1,006 households, out of which 48.6% had children under the age of 18 living with them, 65.3% were married couples living together, 9.0% had a female householder with no husband present, and 22.4% were non-families. 20.8% of all households were made up of individuals, and 10.2% had someone living alone who was 65 years of age or older. The average household size was 3.15, and the average family size was 3.71.

In the city, the population was spread out, with 38.7% under 18, 8.2% from 18 to 24, 24.3% from 25 to 44, 18.1% from 45 to 64, and 10.7% who were 65 years of age or older. The median age was 28 years. For every 100 females, there were 103.4 males. For every 100 females aged 18 and over, there were 94.9 males.

The median income for a household in the city was $37,773, and the median income for a family was $43,952. Males had a median income of $37,340 versus $21,369 for females. The per capita income for the city was $13,273. About 10.1% of families and 13.0% of the population were below the poverty line, including 16.5% of those under age 18 and 5.4% of those aged 65 or over.

== Economy ==
=== Intermountain Power Project (IPP) ===
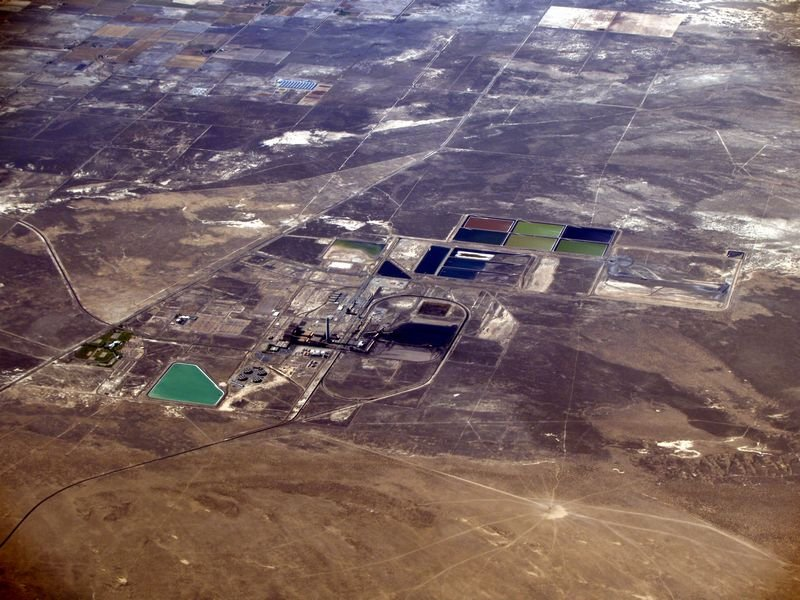
Intermountain Power Project as seen from the air, 2008

One of the main sources of income for Delta is a power plant operated by the Intermountain Power Agency, known as the Intermountain Power Project or I.P.P. It is also referred to as Intermountain Power Service Corporation or I.P.S.C. This coal-powered power plant supplies power for much of Los Angeles county in California. The plant was originally designed for four units, but only two have been built. Each unit produces 950 megawatts of electricity.

=== Materion Natural Resources ===
Materion's, formerly Brush Wellman, beryllium refining plant is located north of Delta in Millard County. This is one of the few sources of concentrated beryllium in the world. The plant is a mill and finishing facility for beryllium, a high-strength, lightweight metal alloy used in military, aerospace, and medical industries. The ore for the plant is trucked from Materion's mine, located in the Topaz-Spor Mountains, 50 miles west, in Juab County. This is North America's only developed source of beryllium. The facility is located here due to its access to the railway and major highways 6 and 50.

=== Graymont Lime ===
Graymont Lime has a plant in the Cricket Mountains, about 32.5 miles southwest of Delta. It is one of the ten largest lime plants in the United States. It was previously owned by Continental Lime which Graymont Lime purchased.

=== Alfalfa ===
Alfalfa hay is the main crop of the Delta area. Due to the dry climate in the Delta region, farmers can control the moisture content of the hay when it is baled. This is very important to prohibit mold growth.

=== Dairy ===
Delta is home to many dairy farmers who may ship the milk out of the county.

== Science ==
=== Cosmic Ray Center ===
Delta is home to the Lon and Mary Watson Cosmic Ray Center, the main staging area for the Telescope Array Project experiment.

=== Fossils and minerals ===
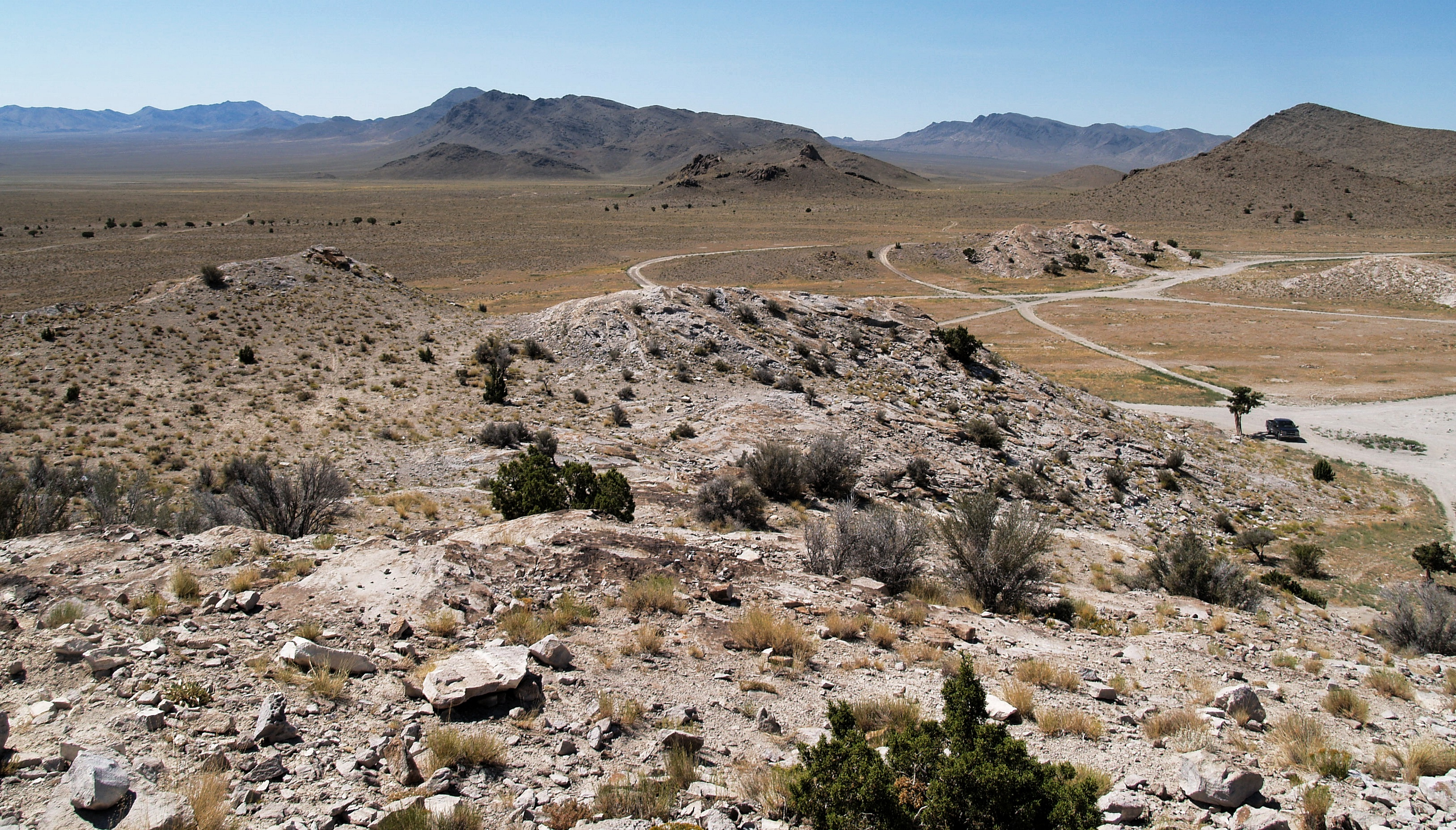
Topaz Mountain

A great attraction of Millard County's economy is the digging of fossils. Trilobite fossils are relatively common in the region west of Delta (part of the House Range's Wheeler Shale). Several local companies maintain fossil dig areas where they allow visitors to dig their own fossils for a small fee.

Near Delta is a mountain called Topaz Mountain, which derives its name from the topaz that is abundant in the area. Other minerals and rocks that are prevalent near Delta include obsidian, opal, and geodes.

== Education ==
=== Schools ===
Delta currently has three public schools: Delta elementary school, Delta Middle school, and Delta High school. Delta also has a vocational school with the Delta Technical Center, which offers many Technical classes, including welding, Machining/metalworking, and Woodworking

==== Delta South Elementary ====
Delta South Elementary School is located at 450 South Center Street in Delta, Utah. DSES was originally built in 1982 to accommodate the growth in population due to the construction of the Intermountain Power Plant. The new school was finished in time for the 1983–84 school year and housed grades K-4. In 1989 the fifth grade was moved back to the elementary school. Because of declining enrollment figures, Delta South Elementary was closed in 2009. Delta Early Childhood Center was created using two-thirds of the South Elementary building to accommodate preschool and kindergarten students in West Millard County. At the end of the 2014–15 school year, the Delta area schools were reconfigured, placing all students in preschool, kindergarten, and first and second grades at Delta South Elementary School.

==== Delta Middle School ====
Delta Middle School serves approximately 420 students in the sixth, seventh, and eighth grades and is located in Delta, Utah. Its students come from the City of Delta and several smaller communities in Millard County.

DMS has a staff of 21 teachers, nine instructional assistants, and eleven additional support personnel.

==== Delta High School ====
Delta High School is a public school located in rural central Utah, drawing students from several small outlying communities. With a new school and a diverse student population, Delta High is the hub of an agricultural-based community. According to the 2013-2014 DHS report card Delta had 549 students enrolled from the grades 9th-12th and an 87% graduation rate.

== Entertainment ==
=== Snow Goose Festival ===
The Snow Goose Festival occurs every winter as the geese migrating through Delta stop at Gunnison Bend Reservoir.

=== Demolition Derby ===
Each July 4, the Hinckley Lions Club sponsors a demolition derby at the Millard County Fairgrounds. The derby attracts crowds of over 3,000 people. It is one of the largest derbies in the United States, with up to eleven rounds of competition, including pickup trucks, figure 8 compact car competition, powder puff, a championship round, and a wipe-out round. Following the derby, there is a fireworks display sponsored by Delta City.

=== Days of the Old West Rodeo ===
A Professional Rodeo Cowboys Association (PRCA) Rodeo takes place every year.

== See also ==
- List of cities and towns in Utah
