= Intermountain Power Plant =

Coal-fired power station in Utah, US

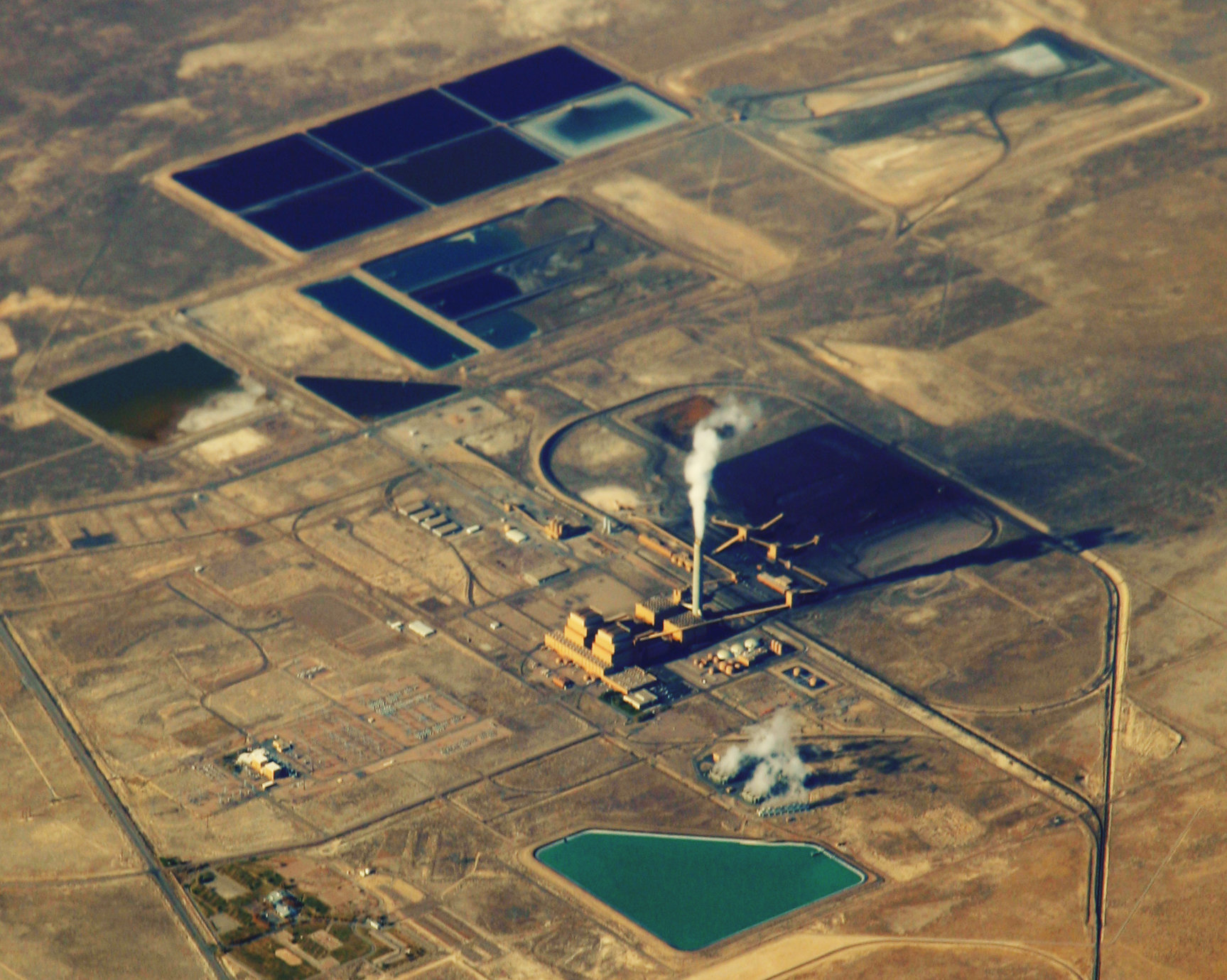
- Aerial view of Intermountain Power Plant, Utah
- Country: United States
- Location: Delta, Utah
- Coordinates: 39°30′27″N 112°34′49″W
- Status: Operational
- Construction began: September 1981
- Commission date: June 1986
- Construction cost: US$4.5 billion
- Owner: Intermountain Power Agency
- Operator: Los Angeles Department of Water and Power (LADWP)

Thermal power station
- Primary fuel: Coal

Power generation
- Units operational: 2 X 950 MW
- Make and model: GE; Babcock & Wilcox
- Nameplate capacity: 1,900 MW

External links
- Commons: Related media on Commons

Intermountain Power Plant is a large coal-fired power plant at Delta, Utah, US. It has an installed capacity of 1,900 MW, is owned by the Intermountain Power Agency, and is operated by the Los Angeles Department of Water and Power (LADWP). The plant includes a HVDC converter. It is scheduled for replacement in 2025 with an 840 MW natural gas plant, designed to also burn green hydrogen.

== Description ==
The power plant consists of two units each with a generation capacity of 950 MW. Generating units are equipped with General Electric tandem compound steam turbines and Babcock & Wilcox subcritical boilers. The boiler houses of Intermountain Power Plant are 91.75 metres (301.0 ft) tall and the flue gas stack is 213.67 metres (701.0 ft) tall. The HVDC Intermountain transmission line runs between Intermountain Power Plant and Adelanto Converter Station in Adelanto, California.

== History ==
Construction on the plant began in September 1981. Commercial operation of unit 1 started in June 1986, and unit 2 in May 1987. The project cost US$4.5 billion. The plant was originally designed for four units; however, only two units were built. In 2004, units 1 and 2 were uprated. These works were conducted by GE and Alstom. The Intermountain Power Agency planned to build the third unit of 900 MW capacity. This unit was expected to go online in 2012; however, the project was cancelled after its major purchaser, the city of Los Angeles, decided to become coal-free by 2020.

On December 28, 2011, one of the generators failed causing the shut-down of one unit for several months.

In 2025, LADWP stopped receiving power from the coal fired plant.

== Natural gas and green hydrogen plant plans ==
By 2025 the plant is scheduled to be replaced with an 840 MW natural gas plant, at a cost of $865 million, which utility managers state is necessary both to avoid blackouts which could result from the non-dispatchable nature of solar and wind generation, and to ensure operation of the Path 27 HVDC transmission line which brings solar and wind power from Utah to Los Angeles.

The new natural gas fired turbines would be the first of their kind capable of burning a mix of 70% natural gas and 30% "green" hydrogen (hydrogen released by the electrolysis of water, using renewably generated electricity) when the plant opens in 2025. The plan is to steadily increase the hydrogen percentage to 100% by 2045, which will require upgrading or replacement of the turbines to be able to handle greater percentages of hydrogen. The project was granted a $504 million DOE loan in 2022.

One expert noted in 2019 that using hydrogen to replace natural gas in power-plant turbines was theoretical and had never been done in practice, and a LADWP IPP official stated that the "economics remain to be seen" and "could be quite expensive."

The first major (500 MW) hydrogen burning power plant in the US was expected to begin burning 5% hydrogen in Ohio in November 2021, and to migrate to 100% hydrogen over the next decade.

== Gallery ==
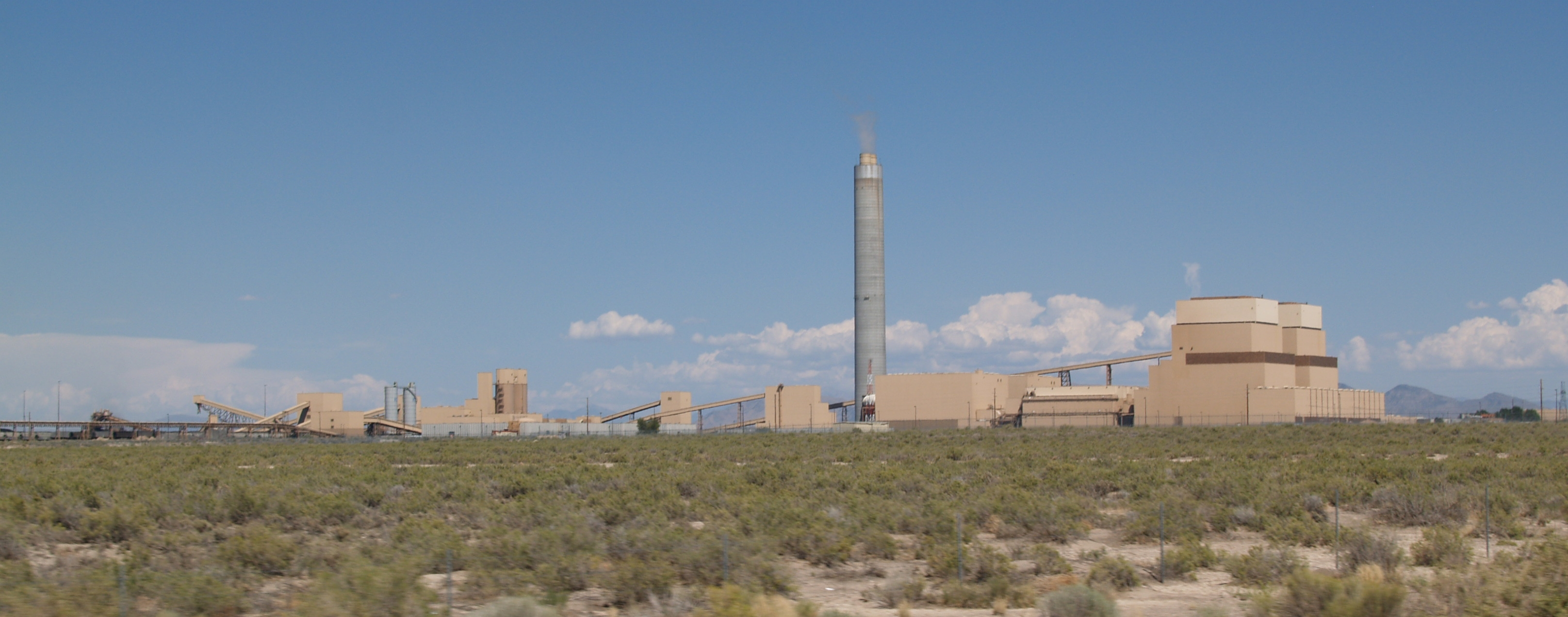
Intermountain Power Plant

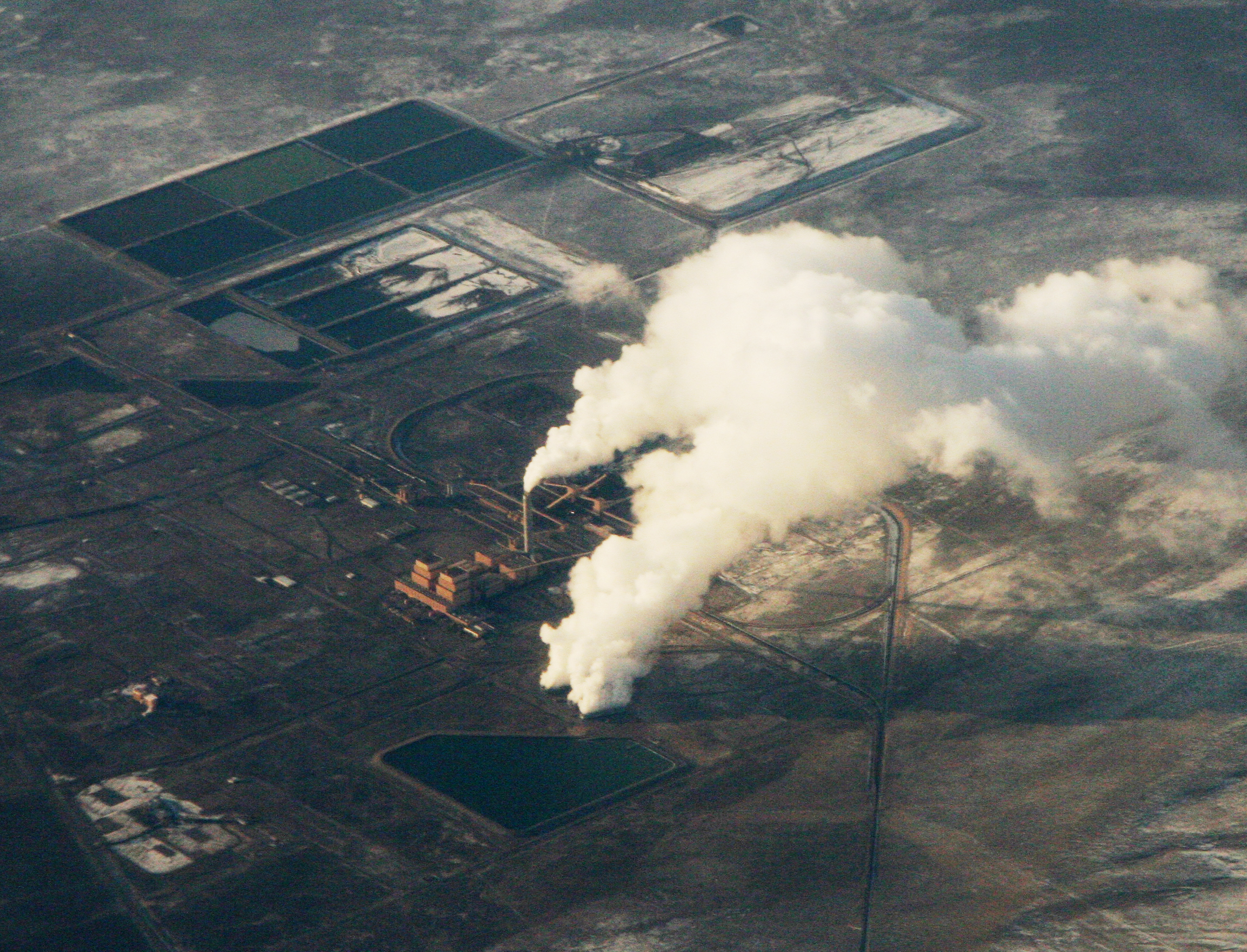
Intermountain Power Plant, aerial, winter 2009

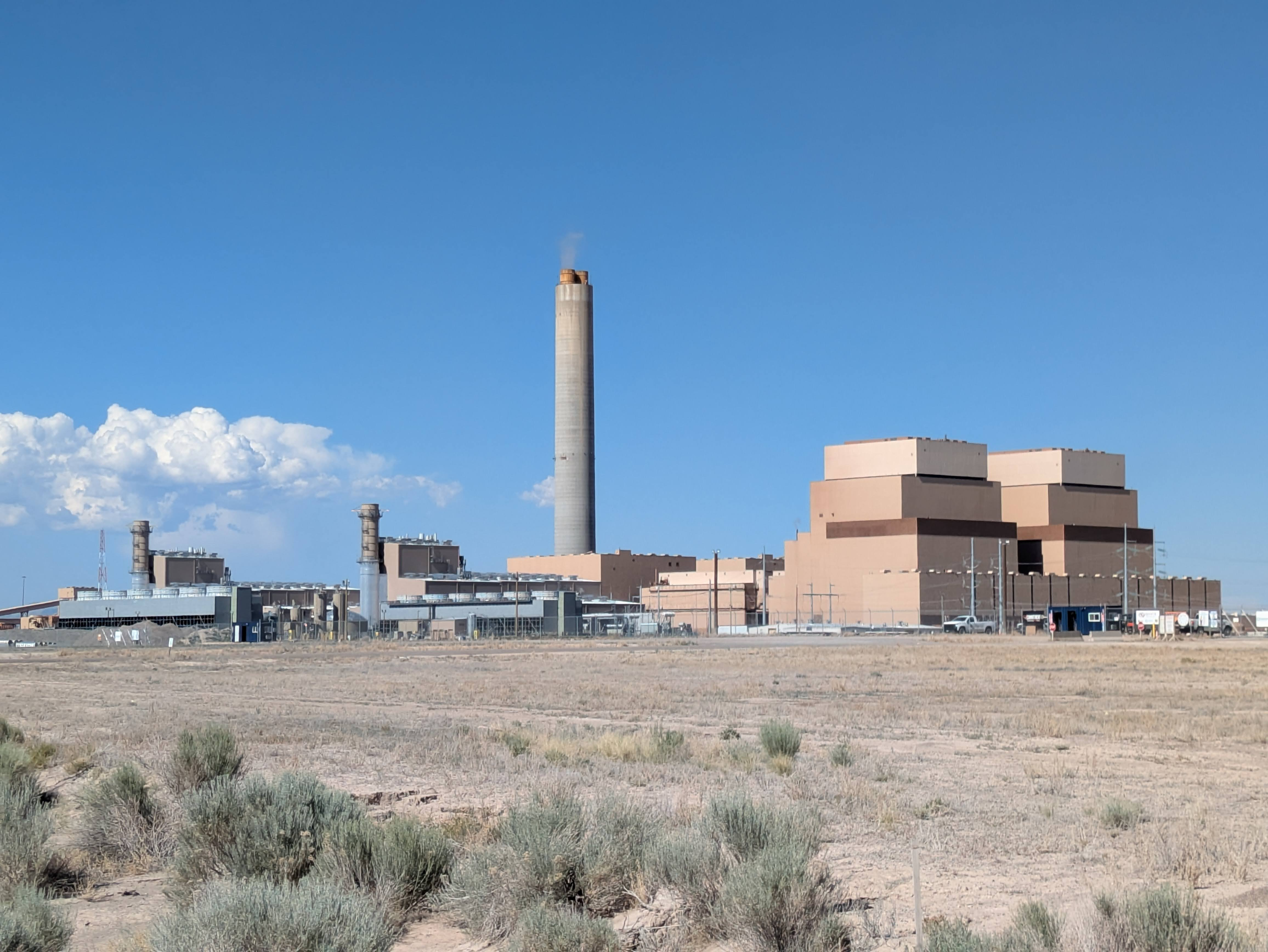
Intermountain Power Plant with completed combined-cycle units post Coal Unit 1 shutdown, July 2025

== See also ==
- Hydrogen fuel cell power plant
