= WECC Intertie Paths =

North American high voltage power link coordinator

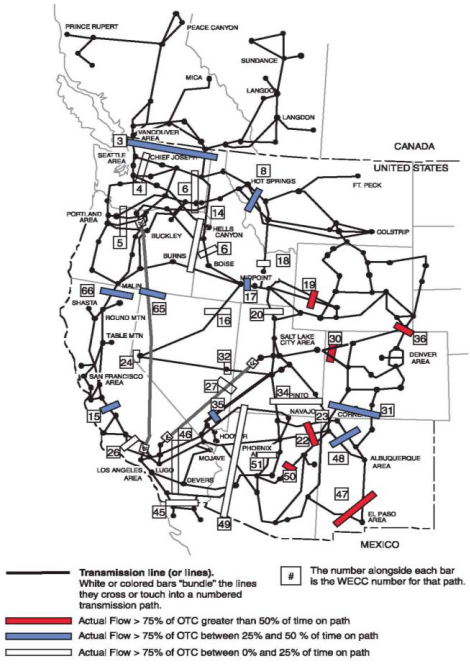
Map of major Western North American power transmission paths

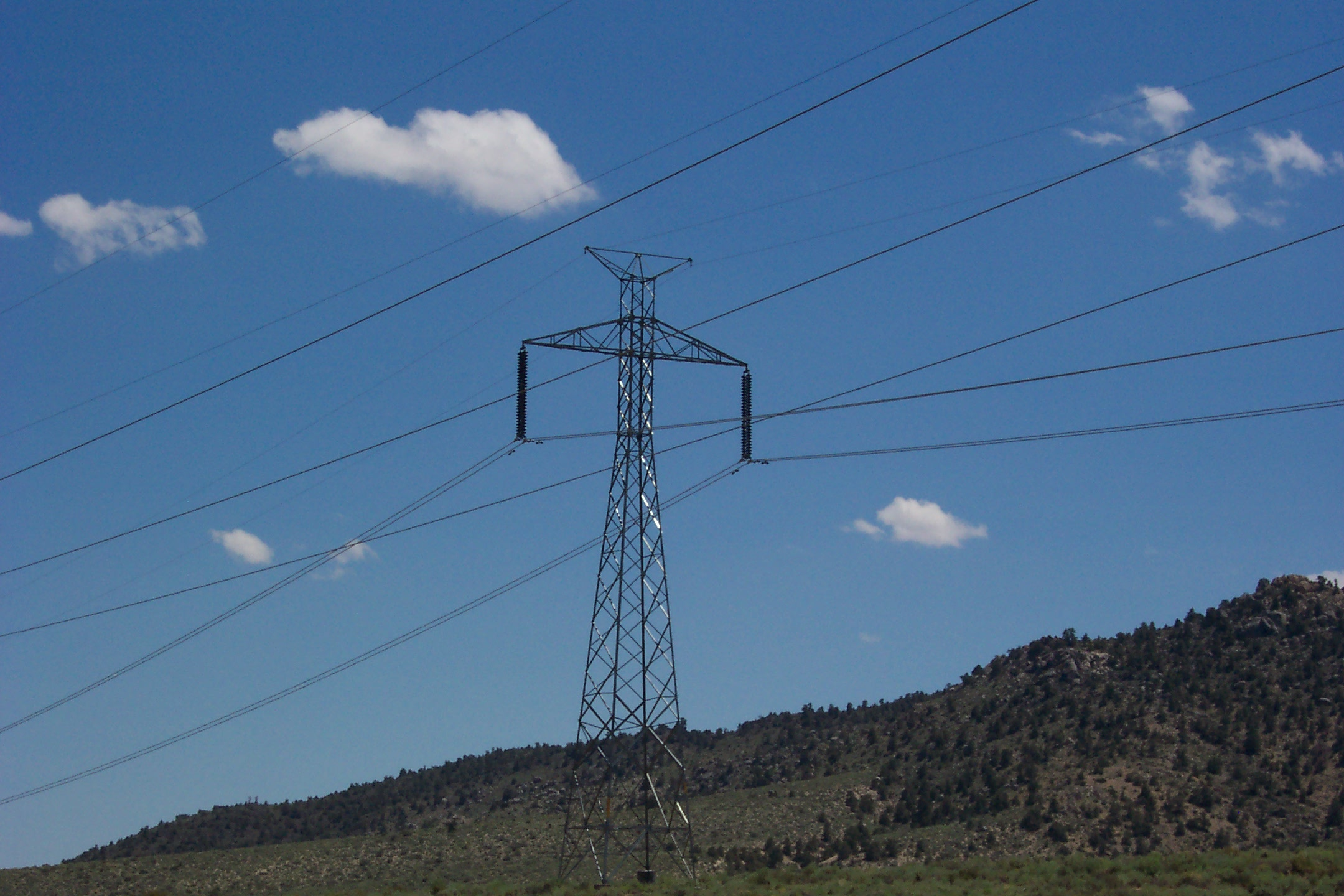
A line on Path 65, part of the Pacific DC Intertie.

The Western Electricity Coordinating Council (WECC) coordinates a number of high voltage power links in western North America. These links, known as WECC Intertie Paths, are not necessarily single transmission line, rather they are interties between various areas. These areas can be quite distant, such as Path 65 between The Dalles, Oregon and Los Angeles, California or short such as Path 62 between Southern California Edison's Eldorado and LADWP's McCullough substations. These are currently numbered from 1 to 81, with a few numbers intentionally omitted.

== Table of paths ==
Since the interties may consist of multiple power-lines, the maximum voltage used is shown in the table below. Some of the links such as Path 65, the Pacific DC Intertie, do consist of a single transmission line, so the maximum voltage is the voltage used.

Path #	Name	Path rating transfer limit (MW)		Normal power flow direction	Max voltage (kV)
Path #	Name	E to W (N to S)	W to E (S to N)	Normal power flow direction	Max voltage (kV)
Path 1	Alberta to BC	1000	1200	W to E	500
Path 2	Alberta to Saskatchewan	150	150	E to W	DC/DC
Path 3	Northwest to British Columbia	3150	3000	S to N	500
Path 4	West of Cascades - North	10700		E to W	500
Path 5	West of Cascades - South	7200		E to W	500
Path 6	West of Hatwai	4277		E to W	500
Path 8	Montana to Northwest	2200	1350	E to W	500
Path 9	West of Broadview	2753	Not Defined	E to W	500
Path 10	West of Colstrip	2598	Not Defined	E to W	500
Path 11	West of Crossover	2598	Not Defined	E to W	500
Path 14	Idaho to Northwest	2400	1200	E to W	500
Path 15	Midway - Los Banos	2000-3265	4800-5400	N to S	500
Path 16	Idaho - Sierra	500	360		345
Path 17	Borah West	2557	1600	Not Defined	345
Path 18	Montana to Idaho	383	256	N to S	230
Path 19	Bridger West	2400	1250	E to W	345
Path 20	Path C	1600	1250	S to N	345
Path 22	Southwest of Four Corners	2325	Not Defined	E to W	500
Path 23	Four Corners Transformer	N/A	N/A	N/A	500
Path 24	PG&E - Sierra	160	150		115
Path 25	PacificCorp/PG&E 115 kV	150			115
Path 26	Northern-Southern California	4000	3000		500
Path 27	IPP DC Line	2400	1400	N to S	500
Path 28	Intermountain - Mona 345 kV	1200			345
Path 29	Intermountain - Gonder 230 KV	200241	Not Defined	E to W	230
Path 30	TOT 1A	650	Not Defined	E to W	345
Path 31	TOT 2A	690	Not Defined	N to S	345
Path 32	Pavant Intr-mtn - Gonder 230 KV	500	235	E to W	230
Path 33	Bonanza West	785	Not Defined	E to W	345
Path 34	TOT 2B see Paths 78 and 79	780	850	N to S	
Path 35	TOT 2C	600	580	NE to SW	345
Path 36	TOT 3	1680	Not Defined	N to S	345
Path 37	See Path 85				
Path 38	TOT 4B	880			230
Path 39	TOT 5				345
Path 40	TOT 7	890			230
Path 41	Sylmar to SCE	1600	1600		230
Path 42	IID - SCE	750	Not Defined		230
Path 43	North of San Onofre				
Path 44	South of San Onofre				
Path 45	SDG&E - CFE	408	800	S to N	
Path 46	West of Colorado River (WOR)	11200	11200	Not Defined	500
Path 47	Southern New Mexico (NM1)	1048	Not Defined	N to S	345
Path 48	Northern New Mexico (NM2)	2150	2150	NW to SE	345
Path 49	East of Colorado River (EOR)	10100	Not Defined	E to W	500
Path 50	Cholla Pinnacle Peak	1200	Not Defined	NE to SW	345
Path 51	Southern Navajo	2800	Not Defined	N to S	500
Path 52	Silver Peak - Control 55 KV	17	17		55
Path 54	Coronado West	1494			500
Path 55	Brownlee East	1915			230
Path 58	Eldorado - Mead 230 kV	1140	1140		230
Path 59	WALC Blythe, SCE Blythe	218	Not Rated		161
Path 60	Inyo - Control 115 KV Tie	56	56		115
Path 61	Lugo - Victorville 500 KV Line	2400	900	N to S	500
Path 62	Eldorado - McCullough 500 kV	2598	2598		500
Path 64	Marketplace - Adelanto line 500 kV				500
Path 65	Pacific DC Intertie (PDCI)	3220	3100	N to S	500
Path 66	California Oregon Intertie	4800	3675	N to S	500
Path 71	South of Allston	1170			500
Path 73	North of John Day		Not Defined		
Path 75	Hemingway - Summer Lake	1500	400	E to W	500
Path 76	Alturas Project	300			345
Path 77	Crystal - Allen	300			500
Path 78	TOT 2B1	700			345
Path 79	TOT 2B2	265	300		230
Path 80	Montana Southeast	600	600		230
Path 81	Centennial	3790			500
Path 82	TOT B East	2465	Not Rated		500
Path 83	Montana/Alberta Tie Line	300			230
Path 84	Harry Allen-Eldorado 500 kv	1390			500
Path 85	Aeolus West	1816			500
Path 86	West of John Day	4760	Not Rated		500
Path 87	West of McNary	4925	Not Rated		500
Path 88	West of Slatt	4760	Not Rated		500
Path 89	Southern Nevada Transmission Interface Plus	6257	4681		500

== Links ==
2024 Path Rating Catalog-Public Version, Western Electricity Coordinating Council
