= Path 26 =

Set of three power lines in southern California

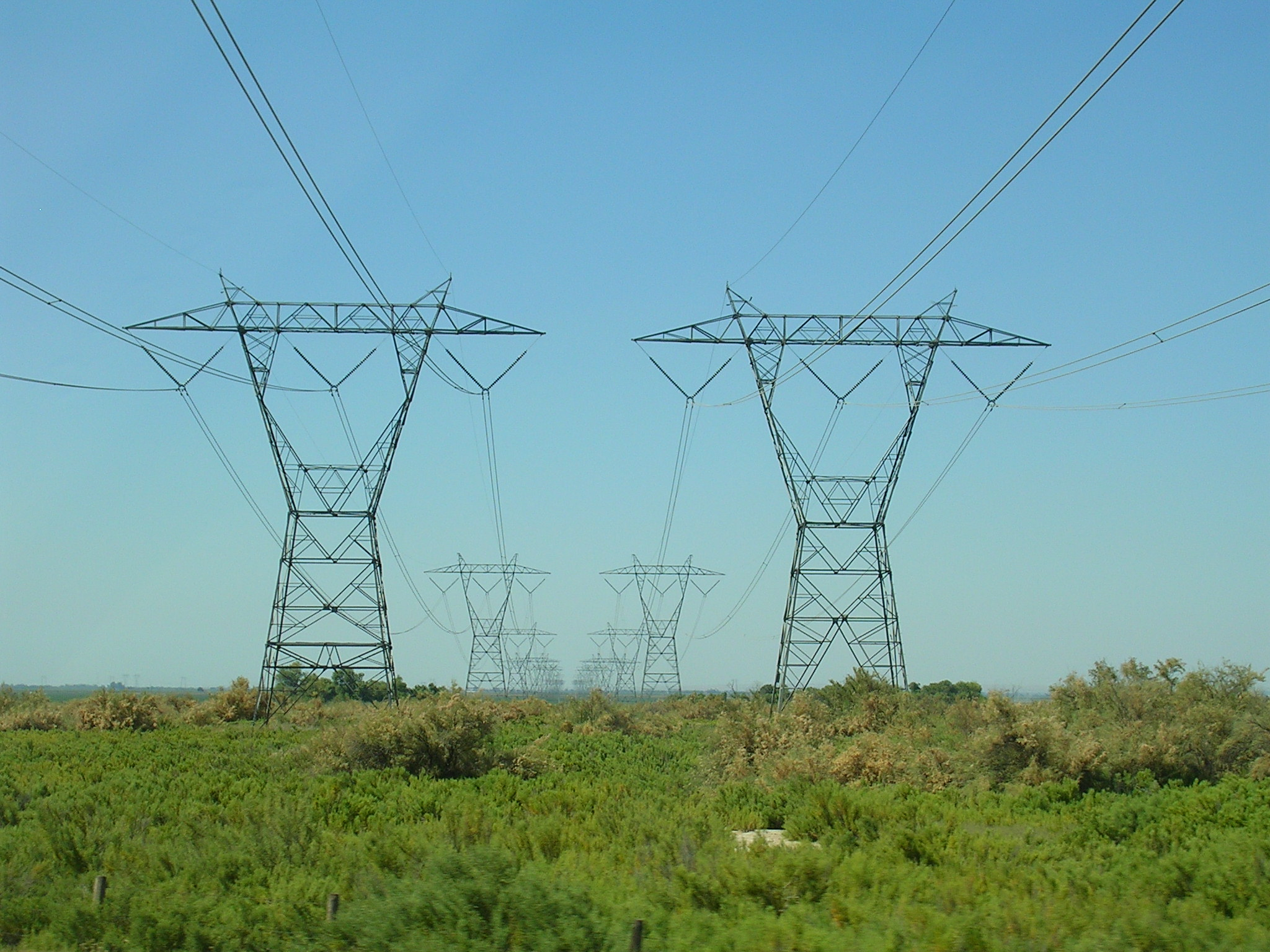
- Southern California Edison's two 500 kV as they cross Interstate 5. Pacific Gas & Electric's in the distant background.

Location
- State: California
- Province: Los Angeles
- Coordinates: 34.4865°N 118.1197°W
- From: Vincent Substation

Path 26 is a set of three Southern California Edison (SCE) 500 kV power lines, located primarily in Los Angeles County, and extending into Kern and Ventura counties, all in California. Path 26 is part of the Western Electricity Coordinating Council's links of electrical intertie paths in the western United States. The Path 26 lines are located in the San Joaquin Valley of the southern Central Valley, the Tehachapi Mountains and other central Transverse Ranges, and the Antelope Valley section of the Mojave Desert.

== Power grids link ==
Path 26 forms Southern California Edison's (SCE) intertie (link) with Pacific Gas & Electric (PG&E) to the north. Since PG&E's power grid and SCE's grid both have interconnections to elsewhere, in the Pacific Northwest (PG&E) and the Southwestern United States (SCE), Path 26 is a southern extension of Path 15 and Path 66, and a crucial link between the two regions' grids.

== Transmission lines ==
The path consists of three transmission lines, Midway–Vincent No. 1, Midway–Vincent No. 2 and Midway–Whirlwind. Midway–Whirlwind was part of what was called Midway–Vincent No. 3 before Whirlwind was built, as part of the Tehachapi Renewable Transmission Project.

== Power transmission capacity ==
The three Path 26 500 kV lines can transmit 3,700 MW of electrical power north to south. The capacity for south to north power transmission is 3,000 MW.

== Expansion ==
There have been talks about constructing a fourth line, but no one has done anything about it. Although power from Oregon, Washington, and other regions in the Pacific Northwest could be transmitted to Northern California, the energy could not easily continue down into the Southern California region as the limited capacity of the path forms a bottleneck. Also, since California's only remaining nuclear power plant is on the northern side, now that SCE's San Onofre Nuclear Generating Station has stopped operation, the California Independent System Operator says that an improvement would decrease prices south of the path but increase prices to north of it, so it was not considered economical.

== Route ==
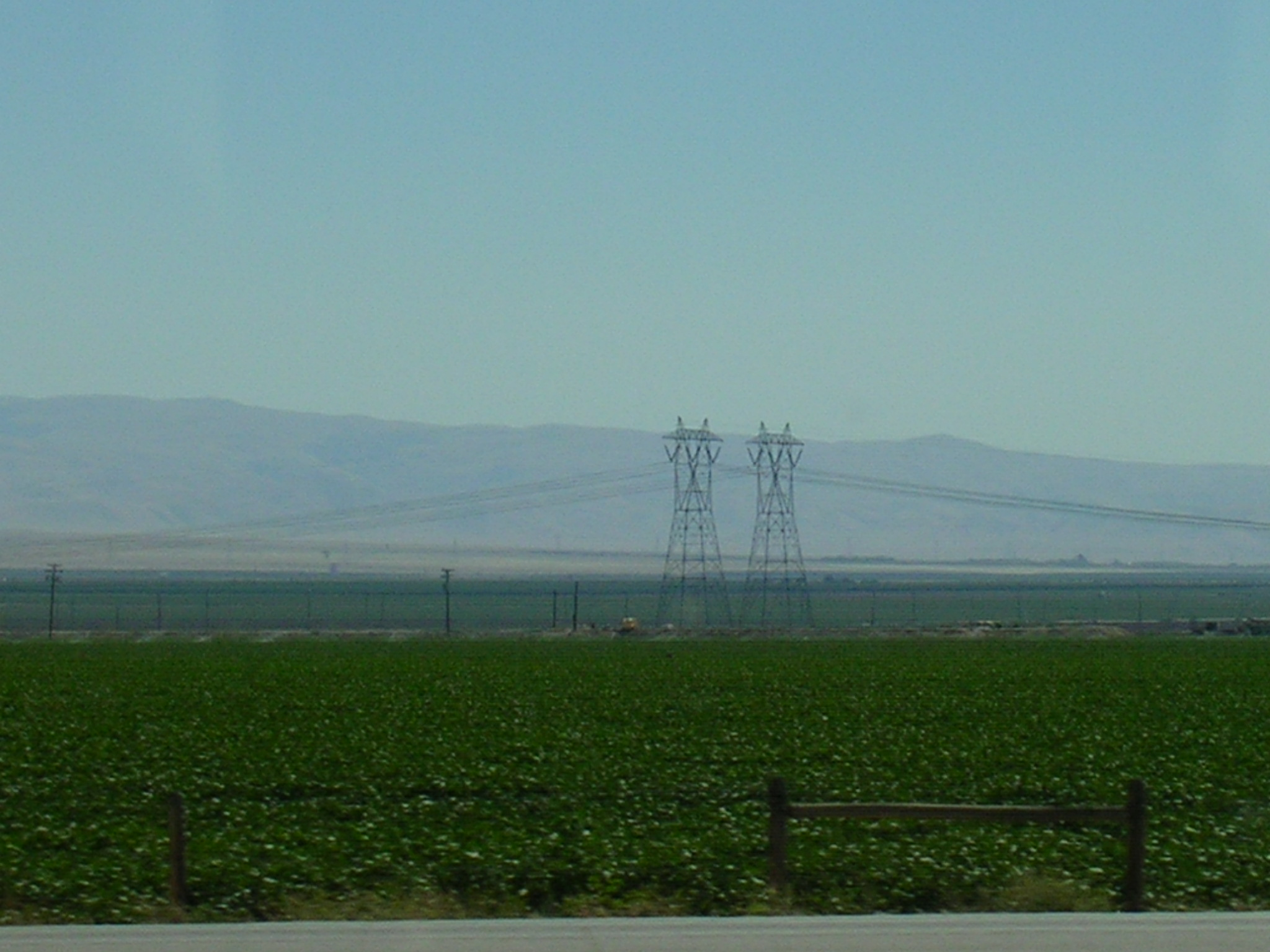
The two western Southern California Edison power lines in the southern San Joaquin Valley of California. Taken on Interstate 5, looking southwest at the semiarid foothills of the Pacific Coast Ranges.

=== Path 26 – Vincent to Midway ===
The Path, starting from the south, originates at the large Vincent substation close to State Route 14 and Soledad Pass near Acton east of the Santa Clarita Valley. The same Vincent substation is linked to Path 46 and Path 61 via two SCE 500 kV lines that head southeast to Lugo substation. As for these SCE 500 kV wires, like Path 15 to the north, the three 500 kV wires are never built together for the entire length of the route. From the substation, all three lines head north-northwest. The westernmost SCE 500 kV line splits away and runs to the west of the other two SCE 500 kV lines.

After crossing State Route 14, two 500 kV transmission lines constructed by Los Angeles Department of Water and Power (LADWP) join the eastern two SCE 500 kV lines. Some point west of Palmdale, one of the SCE lines continues northwest while the other three (one SCE, two LADWP) head west. The lone SCE line continues northwest (with 230 kV lines) runs close to the Antelope Valley California Poppy Reserve, famed for its California Poppy flowers. The one SCE line which ran west of the other two SCE lines (now separated) rejoins the single SCE 500 kV running west along with the two LADWP lines. The four 500 kV lines run together for some distance until, at some point in the mountains, the two SCE lines continue to head west while the two LADWP lines turn southwest and head for the Rinaldi Receiving Station in the San Fernando Valley near Sylmar just south of the Sylmar Converter Station which is the southern terminus of the Pacific DC Intertie HVDC line). The two SCE lines heading west meet up with Interstate 5 on the arid foothills of the Sierra Pelona Mountains to the east of Pyramid Lake. These lines run parallel to the I-5 as they travel over the Tejon Pass (running on the eastern foothills of Frazier Mountain) and are out of sight from the freeway for a while as they cross the high woodlands of the northern San Emigdio Mountains at their highest point at around 5,350 ft (1,630 m).

As for the third line, north of Lancaster and State Route 138, it runs through a remote area of the Tehachapi Mountains with two other 230 kV lines. Although it runs across sparse to dense oak woodlands at around 5,300 ft (1,615 m), it is not easily visible on Google Earth since its right of way is not as clear-cut as Path 15 and Path 66 to the north. Due to this, the line is not readily visible again until it crosses State Route 184 as a PG&E power line. Somewhere the Tehachapi mountains west of Stallion Springs, the line changes from a SCE transmission tower design to a PG&E tower design before turning west. By the time the all three lines are visible again from the Interstate 5, they roughly parallel each other until all three lines, two SCE and one PG&E, terminate at the massive Midway substation in Buttonwillow in the San Joaquin Valley west of Bakersfield. Two pairs of PG&E 500 kV lines originating from Midway, one heading north through the Central Valley to Gates Substation, and the other southwest to Diablo Canyon Power Plant form a segment of Path 15.

=== Connecting wires to Path 46 – Vincent to Lugo ===
Adjacent to the Path 26 wires, two other SCE 500 kV power lines originate from the Vincent substation. These two lines head northeast from Vincent and meet up with LADWP's two other 500 kV lines originating from the Rinaldi receiving station in Sylmar. All four lines head east through the Antelope Valley and along the northern foothills of the San Gabriel Mountains. Another LADWP 500 kV line from the Toluca receiving station near Burbank joins the four-line transmission corridor, resulting in a large path of five 500kv power transmission lines. However, one LADWP line from Rinaldi splits off from the other four lines after passing the Pearlblossom Pumping Station and heads southeast towards Victorville. Shortly afterward near Llano, the SCE lines also splits away from the remaining two LADWP lines which continue eastward towards Adelanto and heads southeast. They cross over the lone LADWP Rinaldi-Victorville line that split away earlier, the LADWP Hoover Dam-Victorville-Century 287 kV lines, and the Interstate 15 as they head to the Lugo substation northeast of Cajon Pass near Hesperia. The lines end at Lugo, where one SCE Path 61 500 kV line, two SCE Path 46 500 kV lines, and three other SCE 500 kV lines also terminate.
