= Round Mountain, California =

Round Mountain
- Unincorporated Community; Census Designated Place
- Location in Shasta County and the state of California
- Coordinates: 40°47′59″N 121°56′35″W
- Country: United States
- State: California
- County: Shasta

Area
  - Total: 1.683 sq mi (4.360 km^{2})
  - Land: 1.677 sq mi (4.343 km^{2})
  - Water: 0.0069 sq mi (0.018 km^{2}) 0.40%
- Elevation: 2,083 ft (635 m)

Population (2020)
  - Total: 160
  - Density: 95/sq mi (37/km^{2})
- Time zone: UTC-8 (Pacific (PST))
  - Summer (DST): UTC-7 (PDT)
- ZIP code: 96084
- Area code: 530
- FIPS code: 06-63134
- GNIS feature ID: 1659552

Round Mountain is a census-designated place in Shasta County, California, United States. Its population is 160 as of the 2020 census, up from 155 from the 2010 census.

== Geography ==
Round Mountain is located at 40°47′59″N 121°56′35″W (40.799633, -121.943058).

According to the United States Census Bureau, the CDP has a total area of 1.7 square miles (4.4 km^{2}), of which 99.60% is land and 0.40% is water.

Round Mountain is the geographic center of the Achomawi and Atsugewi or "Pit River" first nation. The "Pit River" tribe has never signed a treaty with the federal government and remains a strong force of opposition to federal control.

Round Mountain is the home of Hill Country Health and Wellness Center, one of the most solvent clinics in California. It also has the highest awarded LEEDS construction certificates of any clinic in California. Hill Country maintains a large youth facility.

Some organic farmers in Round Mountain are members of the Shasta Regional Seed Cooperative and work together to maintain hundreds of heirloom food crops as well as bio-dynamic farming techniques. Many residents are off the grid, using hydroelectric, solar and wind resources for their home power. Some of these forward-thinking residents also maintain local crime-watch activities and network projects to advance the sustainability of the region.

A large electrical substation is in the area, and power lines (Path 66 and a set of connecting wires to Path 15) run through the town.

A second substation was planned, then canceled, in 2009, along with 650 miles (1,050 km) of electrical lines from central California thru Round Mountain and then northbound. This plan, called TANC (Transmission Authority of Northern California), was halted by citizens who produced presentations statewide, showing that Department of Energy data conflicted with the project's stated goals. This 1.4 billion dollar TANC project was stopped in about 90 days.

Cedar Creek Elementary School is not currently operating, as most Round Mountain students are attending schools in the Mountain Union (K-8) District in nearby Montgomery Creek. Round Mountain Community Center is administered through the local Lion's Club/VFW and has capacity for about 200.

The geography in Round Mountain has been at times very unstable. Several homes, a store, and a nightclub have been among buildings destroyed in landslides. Many of the power lines in the area appear to be constantly repaired due to shifting foundations. After both the Fountain Fire and the introduction of power lines (which increased erosion due to construction as well as due to a program to maintain low or no vegetation under and alongside high-tension wires), slides in the area increased. The location of a major road reconstruction project in 2009 of "the fountain" (a set of curves leading into Round Mountain from the west) became the scene of major shifting, road buckling, and surface water eruptions in the first rain season after completion.

Local geography invites fishing, mountain climbing, and hiking as well as opportunities to experience some of California's wildest land.

== Demographics ==
Historical population
| Census | Pop. | Note | %± |
|---|---|---|---|
| 2000 | 122 | | — |
| 2010 | 155 | | 27.0% |
| 2020 | 160 | | 3.2% |
U.S. Decennial Census; 1860–1870 1880-1890; 1900 1910 1920; 1930 1940 1950; 1960 1970 1980; 1990 2000 2010

Round Mountain first appeared as a census designated place in the 2000 U.S. census.

=== 2020 ===
The 2020 United States census reported that Round Mountain had a population of 160. The population density was 95.4 inhabitants per square mile (36.8/km^{2}). The racial makeup of Round Mountain was 126 (78.8%) White, 0 (0.0%) African American, 14 (8.8%) Native American, 3 (1.9%) Asian, 0 (0.0%) Pacific Islander, 1 (0.6%) from other races, and 16 (10.0%) from two or more races. Hispanic or Latino of any race were 14 persons (8.8%).

The whole population lived in households. There were 75 households, out of which 11 (14.7%) had children under the age of 18 living in them, 32 (42.7%) were married-couple households, 11 (14.7%) were cohabiting couple households, 21 (28.0%) had a female householder with no partner present, and 11 (14.7%) had a male householder with no partner present. 17 households (22.7%) were one person, and 9 (12.0%) were one person aged 65 or older. The average household size was 2.13. There were 45 families (60.0% of all households).

The age distribution was 19 people (11.9%) under the age of 18, 12 people (7.5%) aged 18 to 24, 24 people (15.0%) aged 25 to 44, 58 people (36.2%) aged 45 to 64, and 47 people (29.4%) who were 65 years of age or older. The median age was 54.2 years. There were 77 males and 83 females.

There were 83 housing units at an average density of 49.5 units per square mile (19.1 units/km^{2}), of which 75 (90.4%) were occupied. Of these, 62 (82.7%) were owner-occupied, and 13 (17.3%) were occupied by renters.

=== 2010 ===
At the 2010 census Round Mountain had a population of 155. The population density was 92.1 inhabitants per square mile (35.6/km^{2}). The racial makeup of Round Mountain was 126 (81.3%) White, 2 (0.6%) African American, 12 (7.7%) Native American, 3 (1.9%) Asian, 1 (0.6%) Pacific Islander, 1 (0.6%) from other races, and 11 (7.1%) from two or more races. Hispanic or Latino of any race were 12 people (7.7%).

The whole population lived in households, no one lived in non-institutionalized group quarters and no one was institutionalized.

There were 74 households, 14 (18.9%) had children under the age of 18 living in them, 27 (36.5%) were opposite-sex married couples living together, 4 (5.4%) had a female householder with no husband present, 5 (6.8%) had a male householder with no wife present. There were 4 (5.4%) unmarried opposite-sex partnerships, and 1 (1.4%) same-sex married couples or partnerships. 31 households (41.9%) were one person and 12 (16.2%) had someone living alone who was 65 or older. The average household size was 2.09. There were 36 families (48.6% of households); the average family size was 2.92.

The age distribution was 27 people (17.4%) under the age of 18, 12 people (7.7%) aged 18 to 24, 30 people (19.4%) aged 25 to 44, 55 people (35.5%) aged 45 to 64, and 31 people (20.0%) who were 65 or older. The median age was 47.8 years. For every 100 females, there were 98.7 males. For every 100 females age 18 and over, there were 106.5 males.

There were 82 housing units at an average density of 48.7 per square mile, of the occupied units 57 (77.0%) were owner-occupied and 17 (23.0%) were rented. The homeowner vacancy rate was 1.7%; the rental vacancy rate was 5.3%. 113 people (72.9% of the population) lived in owner-occupied housing units and 42 people (27.1%) lived in rental housing units.

=== 2000 ===
At the 2000 census, the median household income was $18,250 and the median family income was $28,125. Males had a median income of $36,250 versus $28,750 for females. The per capita income for the CDP was $9,598. There were 25.9% of families and 28.0% of the population living below the poverty line, including no under eighteens and 13.3% of those over 64.

== Politics ==
In the state legislature Round Mountain is located in the 1st senatorial district, represented by Republican Megan Dahle, and the 1st Assembly district, represented by Republican Heather Hadwick.

Federally, Round Mountain is in California's 1st congressional district, represented by Republican James Gallagher.

== History ==
On August 19, 1992, a wildfire called the Fountain Fire started off Buzzard Roost Road. The Fountain Fire burned 64,000 acres (260 km^{2}), destroying approximately 600 structures in Round Mountain and the nearby communities of Moose Camp and Montgomery Creek.
