= Buttonwillow, California =

Buttonwillow
- census-designated place
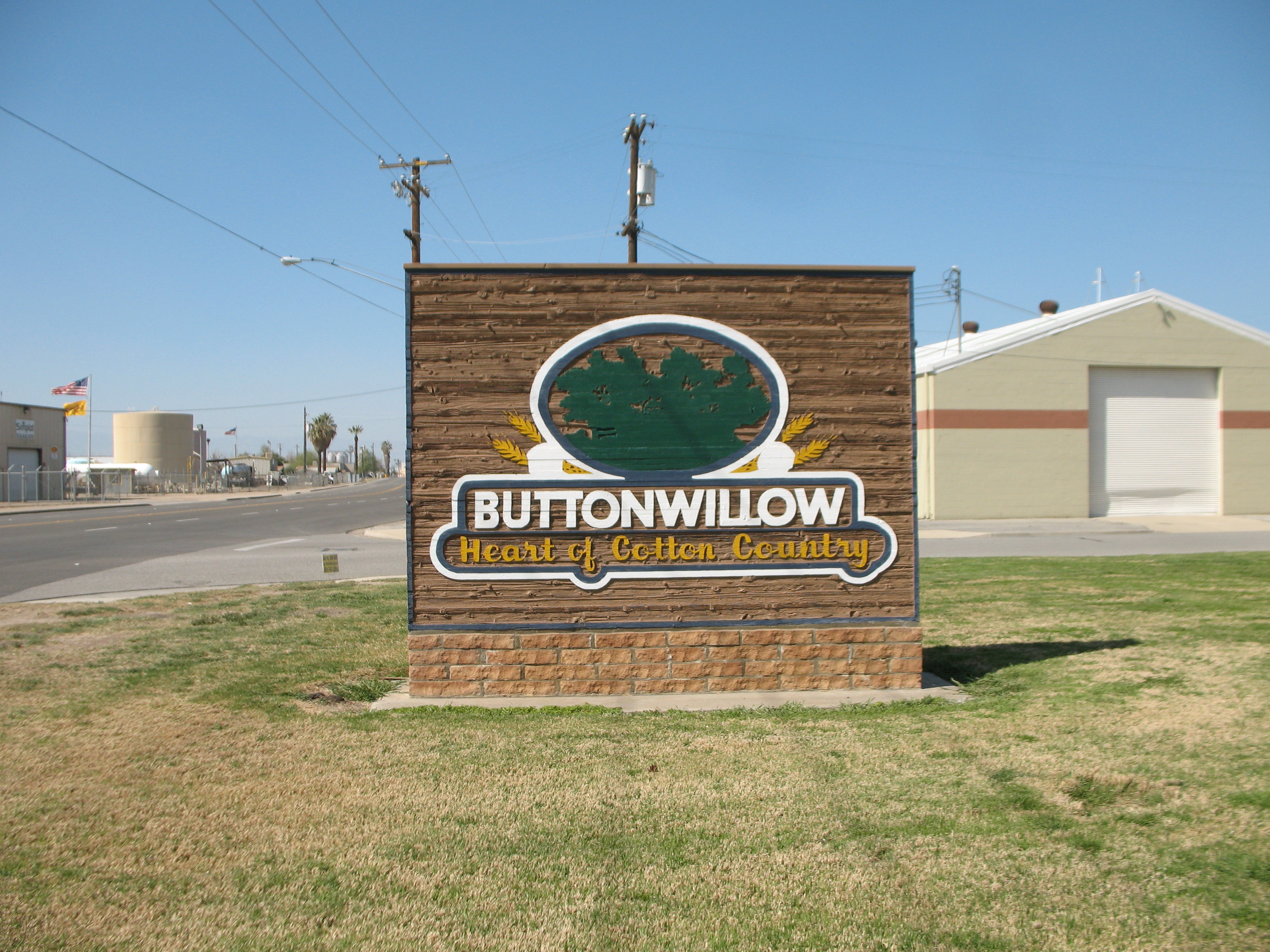
- The entrance to Buttonwillow

- Location in Kern County and the state of California

- Location in the United States
- Coordinates: 35°24′02″N 119°28′10″W
- Country: United States
- State: California
- County: Kern

Government
  - Senate: Shannon Grove (R)
  - Assembly: Jasmeet Bains (D)
  - U. S. Congress: David Valadao (R)

Area
  - Total: 6.93 sq mi (17.94 km^{2})
  - Land: 6.93 sq mi (17.94 km^{2})
  - Water: 0 sq mi (0.00 km^{2}) 0%
- Elevation: 269 ft (82 m)

Population (2020)
  - Total: 1,337
  - Density: 193.0/sq mi (74.52/km^{2})
- Time zone: UTC-8 (PST)
  - Summer (DST): UTC-7 (PDT)
- ZIP code: 93206
- Area code: 661
- FIPS code: 06-09332
- GNIS feature ID: 1652678

Buttonwillow is an unincorporated community and census-designated place in the San Joaquin Valley, in Kern County, California, United States. Buttonwillow is 26 miles (42 km) west of Bakersfield, at an elevation of 269 feet (82 m). The population was 1,337 at the 2020 census, down from 1,508 at the 2010 census. The center of population of California is located in Buttonwillow. (Note: The coordinates of the center of population are at 35.458606°N 119.355165°W.)

== History ==
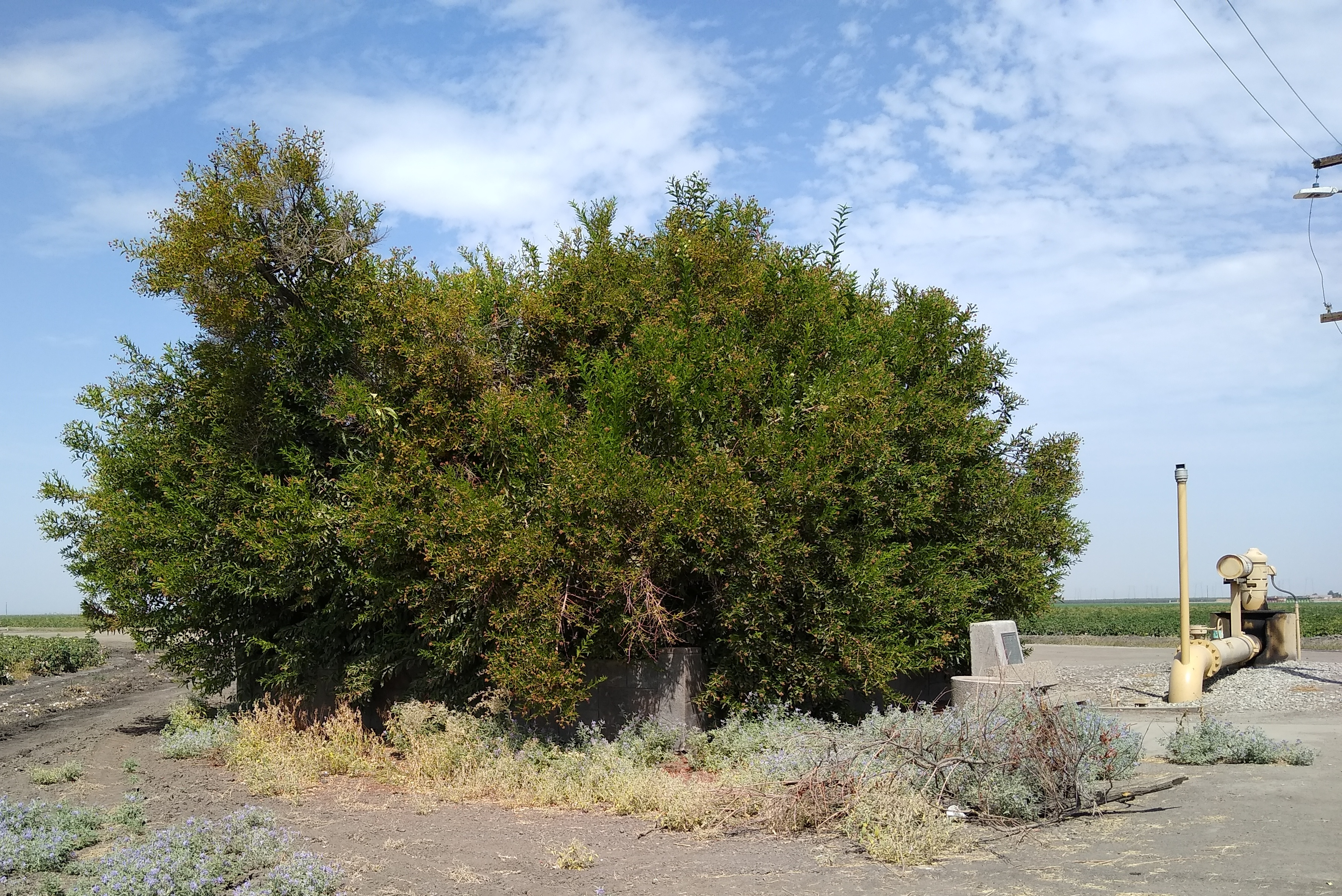
The buttonwillow tree (Cephalanthus occidentalis) for which the community is named

The town was originally called Buena Vista when it was founded in 1895, but the name quickly became Buttonwillow.

Buttonwillow was named for the buttonbush (Cephalanthus occidentalis). A lone buttonbush served as a landmark on an old trans-valley trail and was used by the indigenous Yokuts people as a meeting place, later becoming the site of settlers' stock rodeos. The Miller & Lux holdings company eventually established a headquarters and store near the tree. This tree is listed as California Historical Landmark No. 492. This landmark is now known as the Buttonwillow Tree. California Historical Landmark reads:

.NO. 492 BUTTONWILLOW TREE - This lone tree, which gave the town of Buttonwillow its name, served as a landmark on an old trans-valley trail. An ancient Yokuts Indian meeting place, it later became the site of settlers' stock rodeos. Miller and Lux established their headquarters and store here about 1885."

The first United States Post Office at Buttonwillow was established in 1895.

== Facilities ==
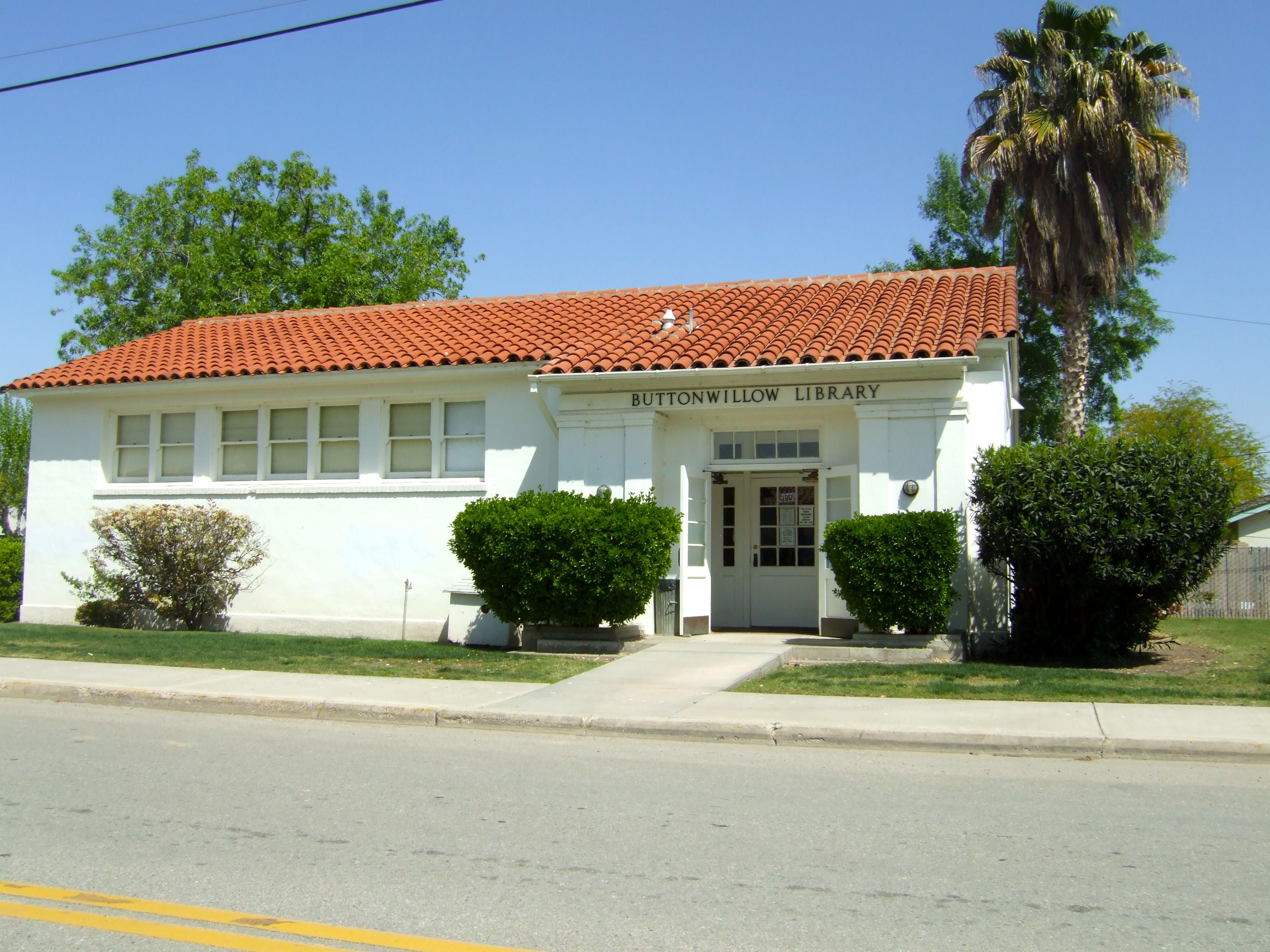
Buttonwillow Public Library

Buttonwillow is a major stop for motorists traveling on Interstate 5. It includes gas stations, restaurants and travel centers. These are all at the exit of State Route 58.

There is a large electrical substation next to the town that is a part of a major north–south transmission corridor. It marks the northern end of Path 26 across the Transverse Ranges and the southern end of the Path 15 power lines. Buttonwillow is the motel hub for members of the Sports Car Club of America's Cal Club region when they hold events at Cal Club-owned Buttonwillow Raceway Park. Several motels are located there as well.

The town is also known for hosting the Best in the West jet rally, an annual gathering of model jet enthusiasts.

Buttonwillow's main industry is cotton farming.

== Geography ==
According to the United States Census Bureau, Buttonwillow has an area of 6.9 square miles (18 km^{2}), all land. Buttonwillow is also locally known as the cotton country, due to the abundant planting of cotton in the vicinity.

Beginning approximately four miles (6.4 km) south of town along Elk Hills Road, between Buttonwillow and Taft, is the enormous Elk Hills Oil Field, formerly the Naval Petroleum Reserve No. 1, which figured prominently in the Teapot Dome scandal that tarnished the administration of President Warren G. Harding. Occidental Petroleum bought the reserve from the U.S. Department of Energy in 1998, and is the current primary operator of the oil field.

== Climate ==
Buttonwillow has a cold desert climate (BWk) typical of the southern part of California's Central Valley with hot, dry summers and cool winters.

Climate data for Buttonwillow, California (1991–2020 normals, extremes 1940–present)
Month	Jan	Feb	Mar	Apr	May	Jun	Jul	Aug	Sep	Oct	Nov	Dec	Year
Record high °F (°C)	80 (27)	85 (29)	92 (33)	100 (38)	110 (43)	114 (46)	114 (46)	114 (46)	113 (45)	102 (39)	94 (34)	81 (27)	114 (46)
Mean maximum °F (°C)	69.9 (21.1)	76.0 (24.4)	83.1 (28.4)	91.6 (33.1)	98.8 (37.1)	104.3 (40.2)	105.7 (40.9)	105.3 (40.7)	102.3 (39.1)	94.0 (34.4)	80.9 (27.2)	70.5 (21.4)	107.8 (42.1)
Mean daily maximum °F (°C)	57.6 (14.2)	64.0 (17.8)	69.8 (21.0)	76.0 (24.4)	84.3 (29.1)	92.4 (33.6)	97.8 (36.6)	96.6 (35.9)	91.4 (33.0)	80.8 (27.1)	67.3 (19.6)	58.2 (14.6)	78.0 (25.6)
Daily mean °F (°C)	47.5 (8.6)	52.4 (11.3)	57.5 (14.2)	62.5 (16.9)	70.2 (21.2)	77.3 (25.2)	82.7 (28.2)	81.2 (27.3)	75.8 (24.3)	65.6 (18.7)	54.1 (12.3)	46.9 (8.3)	64.5 (18.1)
Mean daily minimum °F (°C)	37.5 (3.1)	40.9 (4.9)	45.3 (7.4)	49.0 (9.4)	56.1 (13.4)	62.3 (16.8)	67.7 (19.8)	65.8 (18.8)	60.1 (15.6)	50.5 (10.3)	40.8 (4.9)	35.6 (2.0)	51.0 (10.6)
Mean minimum °F (°C)	27.9 (−2.3)	31.0 (−0.6)	35.4 (1.9)	38.8 (3.8)	46.4 (8.0)	52.2 (11.2)	59.2 (15.1)	57.4 (14.1)	50.7 (10.4)	39.8 (4.3)	30.1 (−1.1)	25.9 (−3.4)	24.5 (−4.2)
Record low °F (°C)	9 (−13)	19 (−7)	26 (−3)	30 (−1)	38 (3)	40 (4)	38 (3)	42 (6)	37 (3)	25 (−4)	21 (−6)	12 (−11)	9 (−13)
Average precipitation inches (mm)	1.19 (30)	1.06 (27)	1.15 (29)	0.47 (12)	0.27 (6.9)	0.04 (1.0)	0.07 (1.8)	0.00 (0.00)	0.03 (0.76)	0.26 (6.6)	0.46 (12)	1.01 (26)	6.01 (153)
Average precipitation days	6.3	6.0	5.4	2.8	1.6	0.2	0.2	0.1	0.3	1.5	2.7	5.0	32.1
Source: NOAA

== Demographics ==
Historical population
Census	Pop.	Note	%±
1970	1,193		—
1980	1,350		13.2%
1990	1,301		−3.6%
2000	1,266		−2.7%
2010	1,508		19.1%
2020	1,337		−11.3%
U.S. Decennial Census; 1860–1870 1880-1890; 1900 1910 1920; 1930 1940 1950; 1960 1970 1980; 1990 2000 2010; 2020

Buttonwillow first appeared as an unincorporated place in the 1970 U.S. census; and as a census designated place in the 1980 United States census.

=== Racial and ethnic composition ===
Buttonwillow CDP, California – Racial and ethnic composition Note: the US Census treats Hispanic/Latino as an ethnic category. This table excludes Latinos from the racial categories and assigns them to a separate category. Hispanics/Latinos may be of any race.
Race / Ethnicity (NH = Non-Hispanic)	Pop 2000	Pop 2010	Pop 2020	% 2000	% 2010	% 2020
White alone (NH)	316	254	184	24.96%	16.84%	13.76%
Black or African American alone (NH)	48	34	25	3.79%	2.25%	1.87%
Native American or Alaska Native alone (NH)	13	8	9	1.03%	0.53%	0.67%
Asian alone (NH)	1	8	7	0.08%	0.53%	0.52%
Native Hawaiian or Pacific Islander alone (NH)	0	0	0	0.00%	0.00%	0.00%
Other race alone (NH)	0	7	5	0.00%	0.46%	0.37%
Mixed race or Multiracial (NH)	22	14	20	1.74%	0.93%	1.50%
Hispanic or Latino (any race)	866	1,183	1,087	68.40%	78.45%	81.30%
Total	1,266	1,508	1,337	100.00%	100.00%	100.00%

=== 2020 census ===
As of the 2020 census, Buttonwillow had a population of 1,337. The population density was 193.0 inhabitants per square mile (74.5/km^{2}).

The whole population lived in households. There were 365 households, out of which 177 (48.5%) had children under the age of 18 living in them, 195 (53.4%) were married-couple households, 26 (7.1%) were cohabiting couple households, 76 (20.8%) had a female householder with no partner present, and 68 (18.6%) had a male householder with no partner present. 53 households (14.5%) were one person, and 20 (5.5%) were one person aged 65 or older. The average household size was 3.66. There were 298 families (81.6% of all households).

The age distribution was 451 people (33.7%) under the age of 18, 159 people (11.9%) aged 18 to 24, 314 people (23.5%) aged 25 to 44, 319 people (23.9%) aged 45 to 64, and 94 people (7.0%) who were 65 years of age or older. The median age was 28.7 years. For every 100 females, there were 109.9 males, and for every 100 females age 18 and over there were 111.0 males age 18 and over.

There were 403 housing units at an average density of 58.2 units per square mile (22.5 units/km^{2}), of which 365 (90.6%) were occupied. Of these, 162 (44.4%) were owner-occupied, and 203 (55.6%) were occupied by renters. Of all housing units, 9.4% were vacant, with a homeowner vacancy rate of 0.6% and a rental vacancy rate of 3.3%.

0.0% of residents lived in urban areas, while 100.0% lived in rural areas.

=== Income and poverty ===
In 2023, the US Census Bureau estimated that the median household income was $35,417, and the per capita income was $16,236. About 31.4% of families and 22.7% of the population were below the poverty line.

=== 2010 census ===
At the 2010 census Buttonwillow had a population of 1,508. The population density was 217.7 inhabitants per square mile (84.1/km^{2}). The racial makeup of Buttonwillow was 534 (35.4%) White, 36 (2.4%) African American, 11 (0.7%) Native American, 10 (0.7%) Asian, 0 (0.0%) Pacific Islander, 890 (59.0%) from other races, and 27 (1.8%) from two or more races. Hispanic or Latino of any race were 1,183 persons (78.4%).

The whole population lived in households, no one lived in non-institutionalized group quarters and no one was institutionalized.

There were 379 households, 225 (59.4%) had children under the age of 18 living in them, 217 (57.3%) were opposite-sex married couples living together, 64 (16.9%) had a female householder with no husband present, 39 (10.3%) had a male householder with no wife present. There were 36 (9.5%) unmarried opposite-sex partnerships, and 1 (0.3%) same-sex married couples or partnerships. 46 households (12.1%) were one person and 29 (7.7%) had someone living alone who was 65 or older. The average household size was 3.98. There were 320 families (84.4% of households); the average family size was 4.30.

The age distribution was 561 people (37.2%) under the age of 18, 162 people (10.7%) aged 18 to 24, 428 people (28.4%) aged 25 to 44, 265 people (17.6%) aged 45 to 64, and 92 people (6.1%) who were 65 or older. The median age was 26.5 years. For every 100 females, there were 110.0 males. For every 100 females age 18 and over, there were 111.9 males.

There were 406 housing units at an average density of 58.6 per square mile, of the occupied units 184 (48.5%) were owner-occupied and 195 (51.5%) were rented. The homeowner vacancy rate was 1.6%; the rental vacancy rate was 4.4%. 699 people (46.4% of the population) lived in owner-occupied housing units and 809 people (53.6%) lived in rental housing units.

== Environment ==
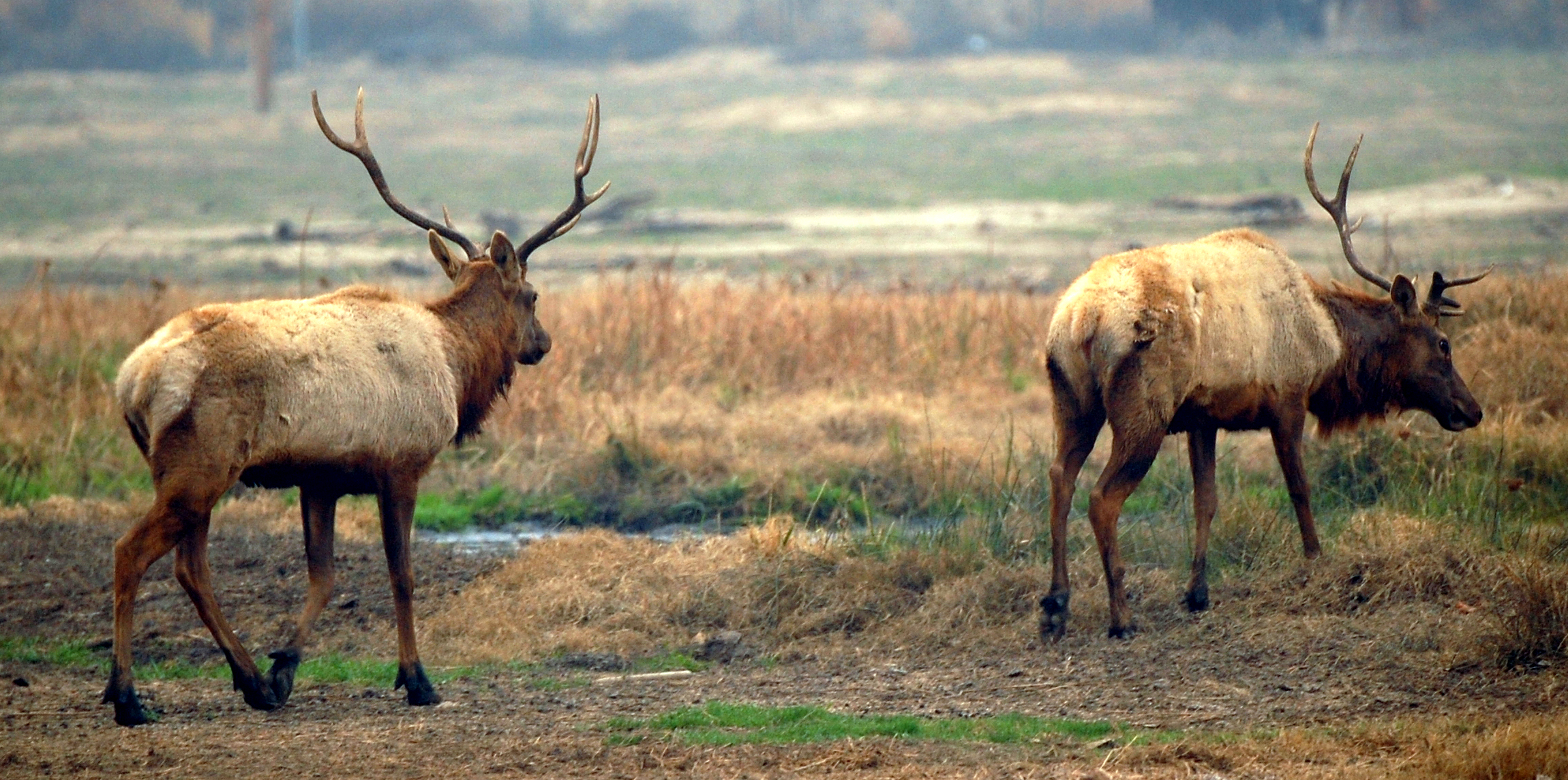
Tule Elk at the state reserve

Buttonwillow, California, is the host to one of California's two active hazardous waste landfills: the Lokern Facility. The facility, owned and operated by a company then known as Laidlaw Environmental, which subsequently became Safety-Kleen and was later purchased in 2012 by Clean Harbors, lies eight miles (13 km) west of the community. It was created in the 1970s, without the notification of any of the county's residents. Furthermore, Highway 58, a busy road through the community, was used as the main route for trucks from the facility to transport toxic loads. At times, as many as 200 trucks per day could travel around the community in a defined traffic route that does not permit trucks through the town.

According to a study performed by Lisa Schweitzer, “transport spills [from toxic waste transporters, such as trucks] generally cluster near origins more than destinations." In the study, Schweitzer observed the amount of toxic waste that is spilled during transportation and the area where spills are generally located. If intermodal facilities and transfer points are considered origins, Laidlaw Environmental would qualify. Furthermore, the hundreds of trucks that transport toxic loads travel in and out of the community every day. Given the results of Schweitzer's study, the residents of nearby communities (Buttonwillow, especially) are at the highest risk of experiencing side effects from the spills. Generally, spills occur as a result of human error, in which the load was packaged incorrectly or the driver experienced a vehicle accident or some other force which allowed for the leaking of toxins.

In 1988, Laidlaw Environmental proposed to build a toxic waste incinerator, which would burn up to 108,000 short tons (216,000,000 lb; 98,000,000 kg) of toxic waste each year. The development and construction of the incinerator was never "green-lit" as a project for the facility. Then in 1992, the birth and death of a child with a physical defect—anencephaly—stirred suspicion from several residents.

In 1992, Laidlaw Environmental proposed an expansion of its facility in Kern County that would double the dump's capacity, making it one of the largest in the United States. Furthermore, it wanted to change the types of chemicals it took from strictly petroleum waste to more than 450 different types of substances, many of which were highly hazardous. According to Juanita Fernandez, a resident of Buttonwillow, those in attendance at the community meeting which discussed the proposed acts were mostly white business-people, with very few locals (majority Latino) representing the community. The name of the committee in charge of the meeting was the Local Assessment Committee (LAC), which was formed in accordance with a law passed by California in the 1980s known as the Tanner Act. The law attempted to give county residents a say in the environmental occurrences and developments in their area. The LAC consisted of seven members, all of which met to discuss events and proposals such as those of Laidlaw Environmental. Despite the apparent effort, residents felt that the rules and regulations of the LAC were not fairly implemented. Even though LAC meetings were held in Buttonwillow, there were no residents from Buttonwillow on the committee. Furthermore, no members were of a Latino descent, although nearly all of Buttonwillow's residents belonged to this demographic group. While many Buttonwillow residents attempted to participate in meetings, there was no one in attendance who was willing to translate for Spanish speakers. Because the majority of Buttonwillow residents predominantly spoke Spanish, their presence at the meetings had little influence. Finally, in June 1992, a Spanish translator was provided at the meetings. One month later, the Local Assessment Committee was suspended indefinitely.

In September 1994, the committee was reinstated. During the two-year span, a draft and final Environmental Impact Report (EIR) was designed for Laidlaw Environmental. The EIR, required by the California Environmental Quality Act (CEQA), “examines the potential environmental impacts of many projects such as toxic waste dumps”. In addition, the decisions that were made in appointing new committee members were criticized for excluding Latino applicants in favor of unqualified white applicants, some of which had not completed the full application. Because of the tension, the LAC decided to appoint a Latino member, Eduardo Montoya.

After the application process, the LAC had ten weeks to convene and discuss the upcoming December hearing about the proposed expansion of Laidlaw Environmental. During this time, the LAC had disputes with the county about their ability to set their own agenda, hire outside consultants, and run their own meetings, powers which the county would not grant them. In December, Laidlaw Environmental proceeded with the hearing and the Board of Supervisors disbanded the LAC. Montoya said that “the Board knew beforehand they would approve the dump” and that “they were just going through the motions”.

A major divider in the struggle of Buttonwillow against Laidlaw Environmental was the issue of race. While the LAC could have spent time gathering community support and increasing awareness about the toxins, the committee members were instead battling racial discrimination and a debate with the county about Spanish translation. A local community group, known as Padres Hacia una Vida Mejor, worked for these particular rights. Furthermore, the translation issue seemed to create a division among the county's residents. For example, in their efforts to institute Spanish translation of the EIR and public hearings, the Latino residents isolated themselves from the black and white people in the community. Many English-speaking residents did not support the translation and felt that speaking English was key if Latinos “wanted to live in [their] country”. Because of these divisions, a racial streak emerged in the community, further dividing the community and decreasing the strength of their resistance.

The struggles of the Buttonwillow community still persist, and even as the residents make progress, they also face additional setbacks. Many of the myths that are often disproved by similar environmental justice cases apply to Buttonwillow. One of the primary myths initially believed by communities facing environmental injustice is that the government is “on our side.” According to Luke W. Cole, this belief is shared more widely among white Americans than among minorities, probably because minorities have historically faced several levels of governmental injustice.
