= Path 15 =

Portion of the north-south power transmission corridor in California

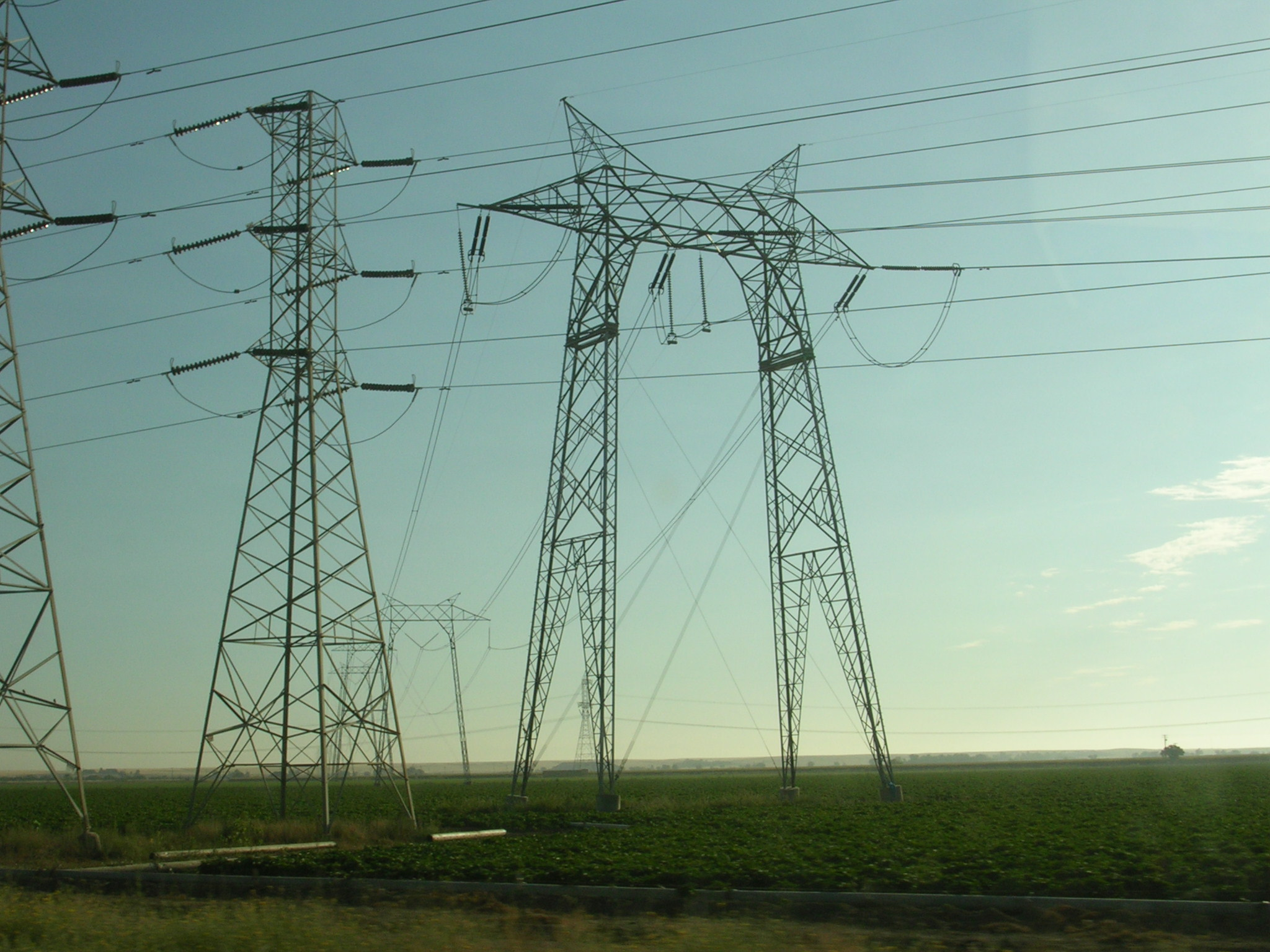
Path 15 near Winters

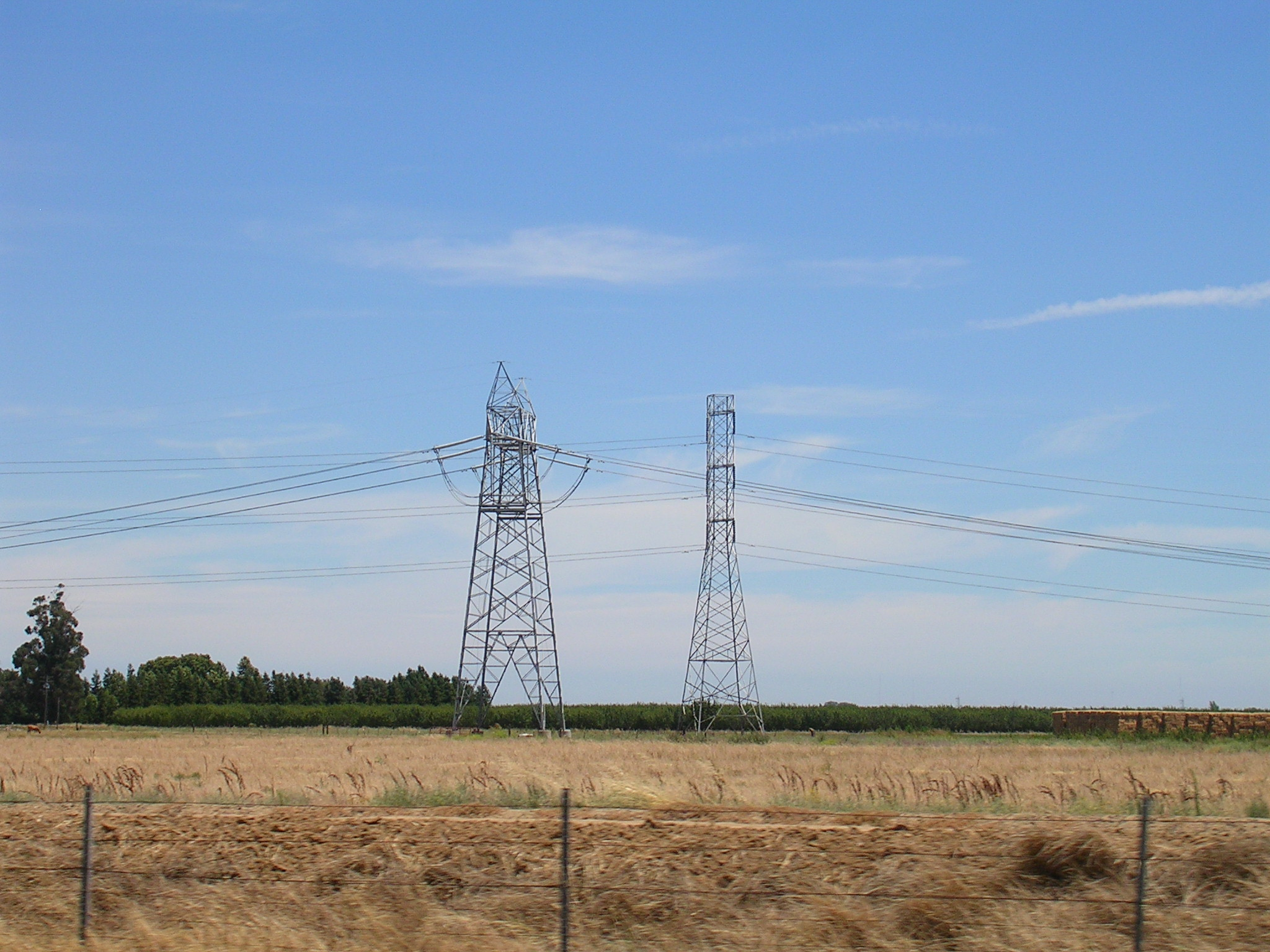
PG&E 500 kV line about to cross Interstate 80 as it leaves the Vaca-Dixon substation located just north of I-80 near Vacaville. The 230 kV line (smaller tower to the right) crosses I-80 as well after leaving the substation. This section of the transmission line between the Table Mountain Substation (near Oroville) and the Tesla Substation (near Tracy) is one of the two PG&E 500 kV lines. The lines often run together (see below map), but in this area they are split apart. The other 500 kV line crosses I-80 east of Davis.

Path 15 is an 84-mile (135 km) portion of the north–south power transmission corridor in California, U.S. It forms a part of the Pacific AC Intertie and the California-Oregon Transmission Project. Path 15 is part of The Western Electricity Coordinating Council's links of electrical intertie paths in the western United States.

Path 15, along with the Pacific DC Intertie running far to the east, forms an important transmission interconnection with the hydroelectric plants to the north and the fossil fuel plants to the south. Most of the three AC 500 kV lines were built by Pacific Gas and Electric (PG&E) south of Tesla substation.

Path 15 consists of three lines at 500 kV and four lines at 230 kV. The 500 kV lines connect Los Banos to Gates and Los Banos to Midway. All four 230 kV lines have Gates at one end with the other ends at Panoche, Gregg, and McCall.

There are only two connecting PG&E lines north of Tracy substation that connect Path 15 to Path 66 at the Round Mountain substation. The third line between Los Banos and Gates substation, south of Tracy, is operated by the Western Area Power Administration (WAPA), a division of the United States Department of Energy. This line was constructed away from the other two lines and is often out of sight. Most of the time the lines are in California's Sierra foothills and the Central Valley, but there are some PG&E lines that come from power plants along the shores of the Pacific Ocean and cross the California Coast Ranges and connect with the intertie. The Diablo Canyon Power Plant and the Moss Landing Power Plant are two examples.

== The route ==
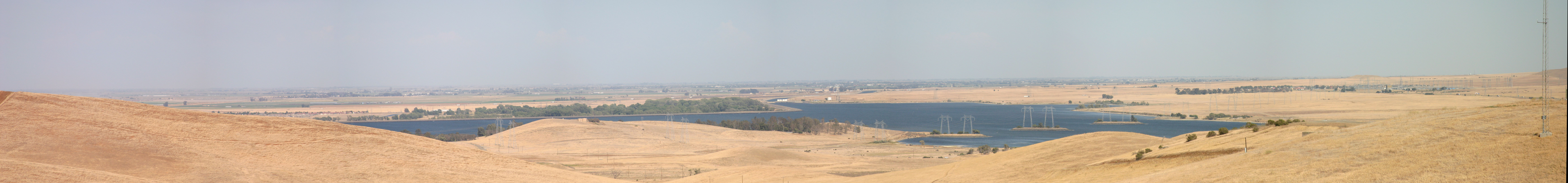
Path 15 across O'Neill Forebay

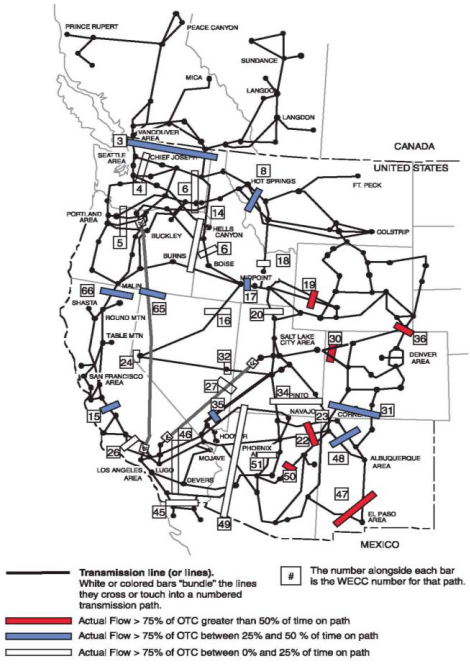
Path 15 can be seen on the left of this map, south of San Francisco

The route is generally 3 to 7 miles (4.8 to 11.3 km) west of Interstate 5 from the Los Banos substation, west of Los Banos, to the Midway substation, near Buttonwillow.

=== Connecting lines to Path 15 – Round Mountain to Los Banos substation ===
The two connecting PG&E power lines start at Round Mountain substation at Round Mountain. The parallel PacifiCorp and PG&E lines north of Round Mountain are considered to be Path 66, not Path 15. These connecting lines to Path 15 will consist of two 500 kV lines until south of Tracy. Heading south, the lines run through the foothills of the northern Sierra Nevada mountains towards the Table Mountain Substation (39°33′26.57″N 121°38′40.23″W) northwest of Oroville. The lines head southeast from Table Mountain Substation; near the Sutter Buttes the two lines separate. One line heads almost due south, passing to the west of Sacramento and east of Davis. The other line continues southwest for some distance and then turns south and enters the Vaca-Dixon Substation along Interstate 505. The Vaca-Dixon substation (38°24′8.33″N 121°55′14.75″W) was the world's largest substation at the time of its inauguration in 1922. Just north of the Sacramento River and the city of Antioch the two lines rejoin and head in a south-southeasterly direction. The two PG&E lines span across both the Sacramento and San Joaquin Rivers on massive pylons along with the lone 500 kV Western Area Power Administration Path 66 line. Western's Path 66 line then turns east and runs parallel to the two PG&E lines to the west as all three lines head southeast. Both PG&E lines run to the west of the Clifton Court Forebay and cross Interstate 580 before entering the Tesla substation west of Tracy.

Leaving the Tesla Substation (37°42′33.52″N 121°33′48″W) one PG&E line heads southwest and two parallel PG&E lines continue in a south-southeasterly direction along the eastern foothills of the Diablo Range and the western edge of the San Joaquin Valley. Only one of the two parallel lines heading southeast connects with Path 15, since one line serves as a connector to WAPA's Tracy Substation. This connector line abruptly turns north when a rare, tall dual-circuit WAPA line meets the two PG&E lines. The same dual-circuit line carries the third 500 kV line that joins the lone southeastward PG&E line. South of this point is where the 500 kV transmission system consists of three lines, not two. Despite being located in the eastern foothills of the Diablo Range, the two eastern lines cross a body of water - the O'Neill Forebay of the massive San Luis Reservoir (just to the east of the San Luis Dam) on several artificial islands.

The lone southwestward 500 kV PG&E line crosses the Diablo Ridge, rising to 808 m (2,650 feet) near Mount Hamilton. The same line then heads into the Metcalf substation near San Jose and the Metcalf Energy Center. Leaving Metcalf substation, the line crosses the southern Santa Cruz Mountains with a 230 kV line and enters the large Moss Landing Power Plant substation in Moss Landing. The same line then heads east to rejoin the parallel PG&E lines at the Los Banos substation, effectively forming a 500 kV loop.

=== Path 15–Los Banos to Midway substation ===
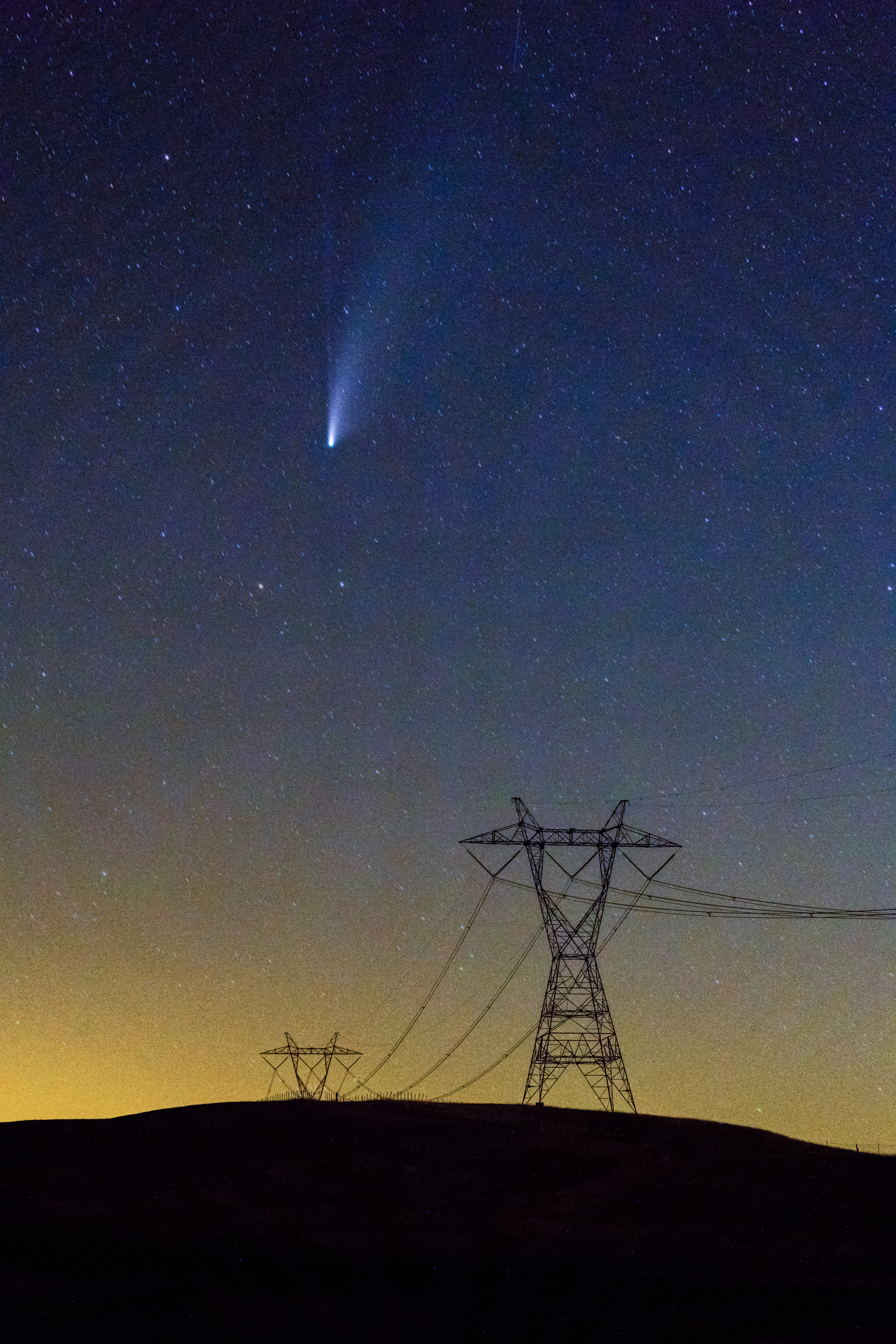
A silhouette of Path 15 with C/2020 F3 (NEOWISE) in the night sky. This image was taken near the Little Panoche Reservoir along County Route J1 in western Fresno County.

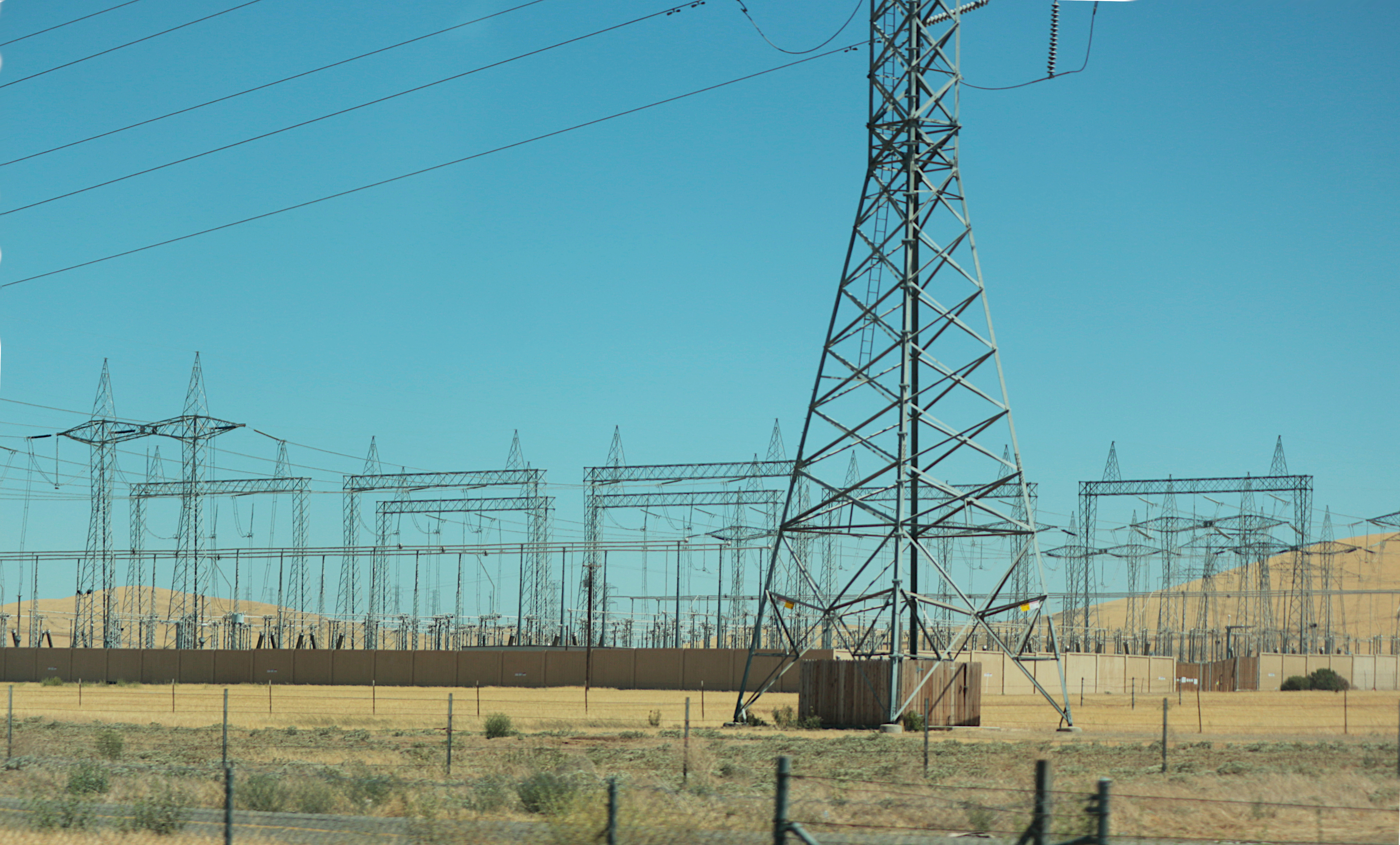
The Los Banos substation.

South of the Los Banos substation (37°3′7.69″N 121°1′10.37″W) the three 500kV lines (two PG&E and one WAPA) continue to head southeast, with the lone WAPA line running to the west of the two parallel PG&E lines. The lines regroup as they enter the Gates Substation near Coalinga. The Los Banos-Gates third 500 kV line is the only WAPA-built section of 500 kV line in Path 15 and the third WAPA 500 kV line is also the only line with triple-bundle conductors in Path 15.

Exiting the Gates substation (36°8′28″N 120°7′37″W), two parallel PG&E lines continue heading southeastward and one line heads southwest with a 230 kV line. This 500 kV line once again crosses the Diablo Range as it heads towards the Pacific Ocean. The line crosses Highway 101 in Atascadero and Highway 1 near Morro Bay. After crossing some rugged coastal hills, the line enters the Diablo Canyon Power Plant substation. Due to the massive amount of power generated by the plant, a second 500 kV line was built alongside the first, as the parallel lines head east to form another 500 kV loop. These parallel lines cross Highway 101 north of Pismo Beach and traverse over some southern coastal mountains. After reaching a height of over 1,200 m or 3,937 feet, the two parallel lines head down the arid foothills of the southern San Joaquin Valley and split up. The two lines rejoin just before entering the Midway Substation (35°24′23.68″N 119°27′7.99″W) near Buttonwillow. The other two eastern lines also head into the same substation from the north. Southern California Edison's (SCE) two Path 26 lines connect to PG&E's grid at the Midway Substation. A PG&E line heading southeast from Midway substation is the third line of Path 26, not Path 15. Eventually, this line is replaced with SCE towers.

=== Substations ===
From north to south:

==== Connecting power lines ====
- Round Mountain
- Table Mountain
- Vaca-Dixon
- Tesla
- Metcalf
- Moss Landing
- Diablo Canyon

==== Path 15 ====
- Los Banos, the substation is approximately 9 miles (14 km) west of Los Banos
- Gates, located about 13 miles (21 km) east of Coalinga
- Midway, one mile (1.6 km) east of Buttonwillow

== Western Area Power Administration's third line north of Tracy ==
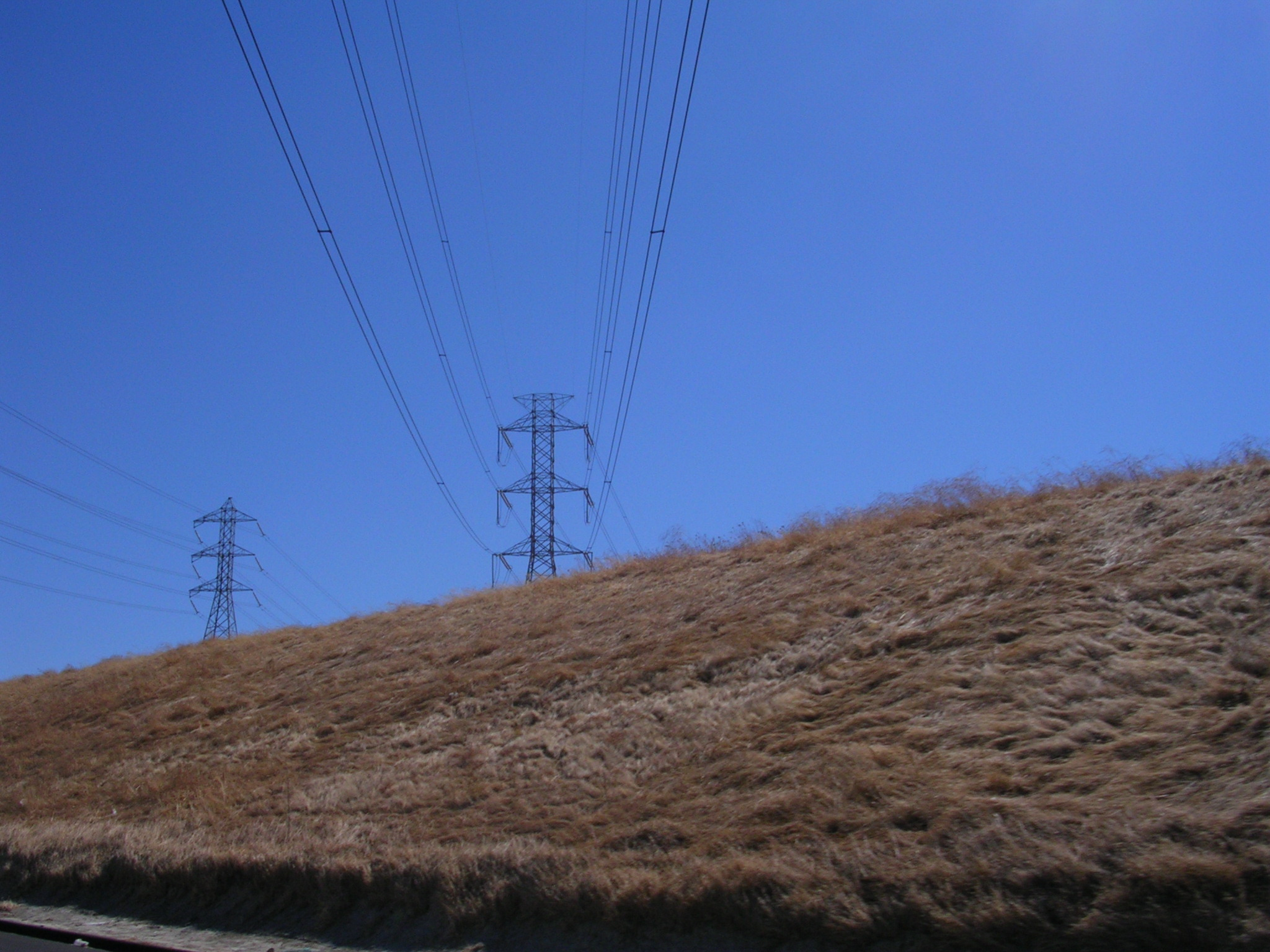
Rare dual-circuit 500 kV tower (right) (operated by WAPA) and smaller dual-circuit 230 kV tower (left) (operated by Modesto Irrigation District), crossing I-580.

WAPA's 500 kV line starts at the Captain Jack substation (42°4′38.06″N 121°23′25.47″W) well to the northeast of Round Mountain. This is the Western Area Power Administration's (WAPA) Path 66 transmission line. It also heads southwest across the Modoc Plateau and crosses Interstate 5 near Cottonwood (north of Red Bluff). West of Cottonwood the line turns south and enters an electrical substation near Olinda. At Olinda, lines carrying power from Shasta Dam and other nearby United States Bureau of Reclamation facilities connect with the line. This is the end of Path 66, but WAPA's 500 kV line continues from Olinda Substation along the western edge of the Sacramento Valley. Near Antioch the line runs parallel with the two PG&E lines. All three lines cross both the Sacramento and San Joaquin Rivers on very large pylons. The WAPA line turns away from the PG&E lines and heads for another large substation near Tracy. South of Tracy Substation (37°47′51″N 121°34′51″W), it continues as a large, dual-circuit 500 kV line that connects with the PG&E lines as they leave Tesla Substation.

== Issues ==
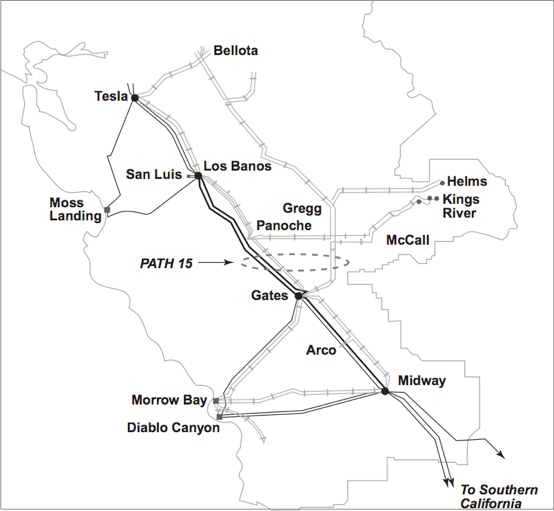
2006 study proposing the 84-mile long, 500 kV line between Los Banos and Gates, which was eventually built. In the above illustration from 2006, only two of the eventual three lines are shown.

Other power lines that follow Path 15

From Tesla substation to Midway substation, a set of 230 kV lines follows the main 500 kV lines. The dual-circuit 230 kV power lines run to the east of the 500 kV lines. Most of these lines were built by PG&E.

Power transmission capacity

Path 15 can transmit 2,000-3,265 MW of electrical power from north to south. The capacity for south to north power transmission is 4,800-5,400 MW.

Parallelism of Interstate 5 (south of Tesla substation)

In the section south of Tracy, the eastern two lines form an infrastructure corridor along with an aqueduct and Interstate 5 and provide some artificial scenery to look at, especially when they do not run in the hills west of Interstate 5. The eastern parallel PG&E lines cross Interstate 5 twice.

Environmental impacts

The northern part of this electrical transmission corridor (including Path 66) is visible from space and Google Earth as lines of bare, treeless ground. This is because the power lines here run through forests of conifer trees which appear dark-green from space. The utility companies here have logged and sometimes clear-cut the land to create a right-of-way for the power lines due to the fact that a wildfire could start when an electrical arc occurs between the lines and a tree if they come close enough to each other.

== Differences in tower design ==
Like Western Area Power Administration's 500 kV line, the tower design for the entire transmission system is not the same, although the difference is not as dramatic as on the WAPA line. For the PG&E line, the differences are subtle and from a casual, far away view, it looks like the towers are all the same for the entire power line. It seems to be south of the Table Mountain substation, the tower legs spread apart from the tower bridge (upper section of tower) down to the tower base and there are four guy lines for tower stability. In contrast, the towers to the north of Table Mountain have thinner legs and look like thin sticks from far away. The weaker tower legs have two additional guy lines for stability. As for the tower bridge, the towers south of Table Mountain have five X's in between the tower legs. The towers north of Table Mountain have only four X's. In addition, the tower arms on either side of the towers have smaller steel bars inside for added strength. In the northern towers, they are positioned like equilateral triangles, but south of Table Mountain, they are shaped like right triangles. See below for a visual comparison.

Visual reference

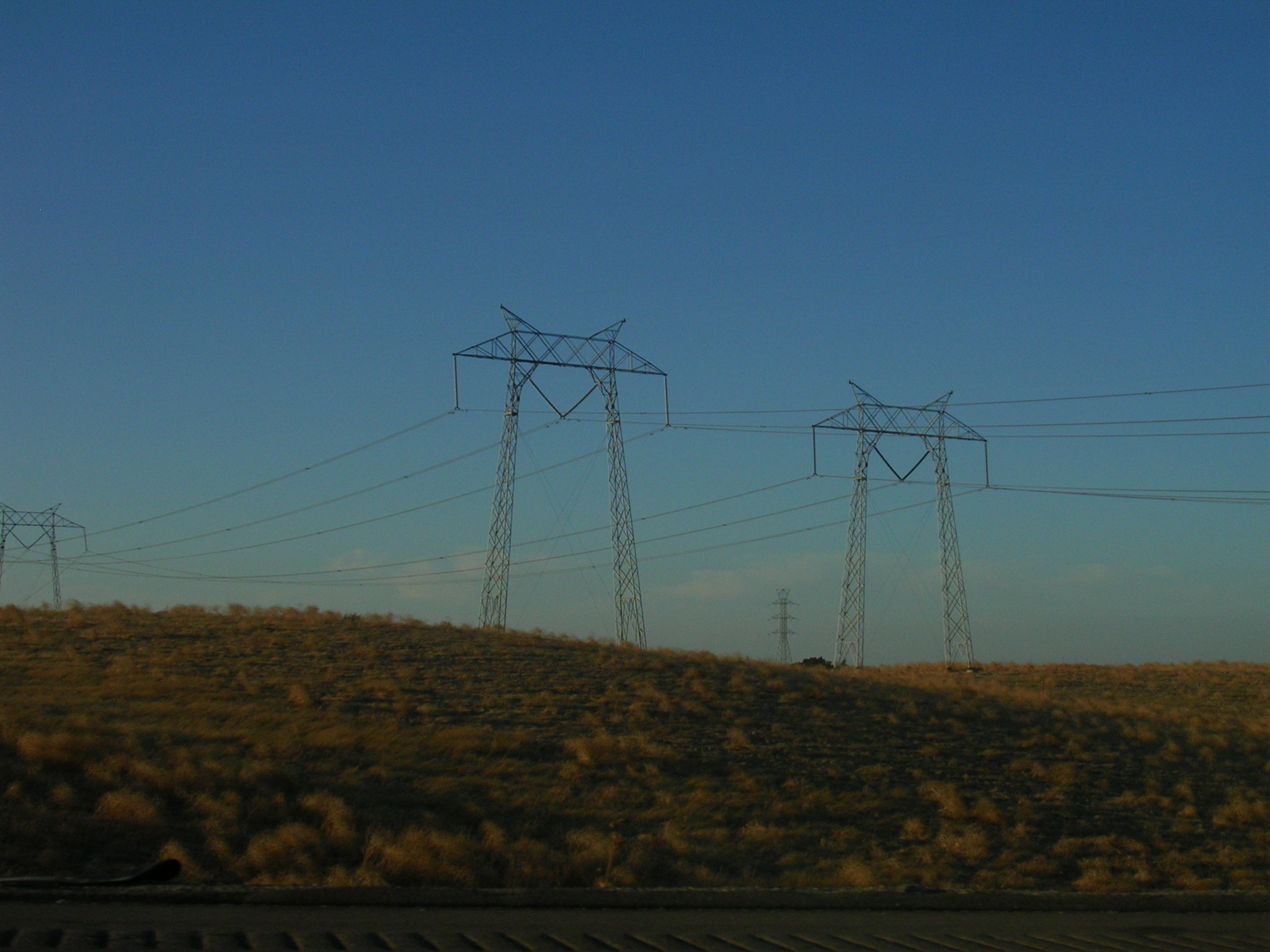
PG&E lines near the I-580 / I-205 interchange; another view.

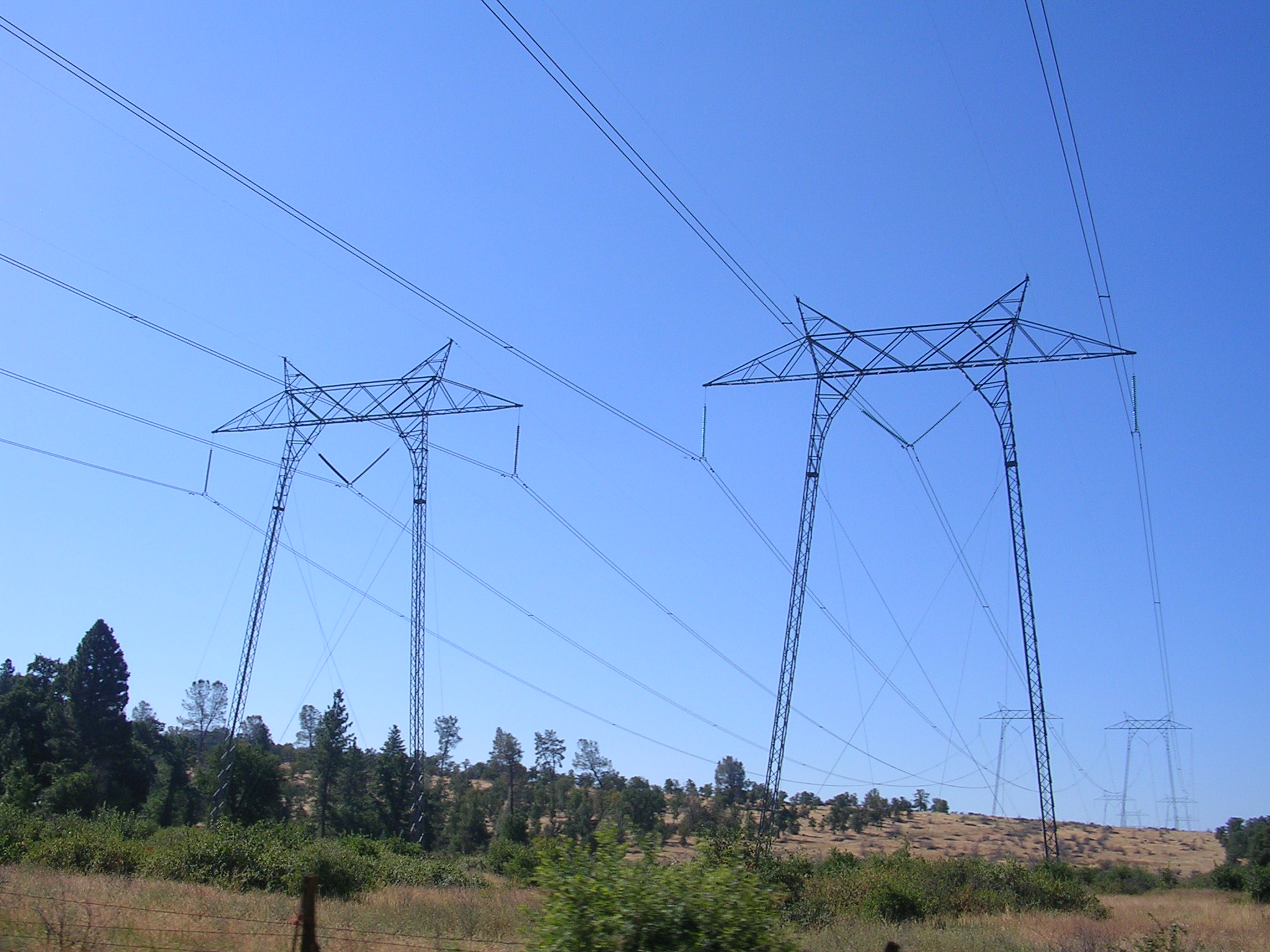
Thinner towers north of Table Mountain crossing SR 36, cutting through the woodlands of the Sierra foothills. They resemble the southern towers to the left, but look closely to see the differences.

== History ==
This entire project was built in the 1970s and 1980s in order to provide California and the Southwest with excess hydropower from the Pacific Northwest without actually having to construct any new power plants. During the cold Pacific Northwest winters, power is sent north due to heater use. This transfer reverses in the hot, dry summers, when many people in the South run air conditioners. In order to do this the maximum south-to-north transmission capacity is 5,400 MW for most parts, but between Los Banos substation and Gates substation, there were only two 500 kV lines. The capacity at this electricity bottleneck was only 3,900 MW, and this was identified in the 1990s as a trouble spot, but no one acted upon it. This bottleneck was one of the leading causes of the California electricity crisis in 2000–2001. To remedy this problem, WAPA along with several utilities built a third 500 kV line between these two substations to eliminate this transmission constraint and raise the maximum south-to-north transmission capacity to 5,400 MW. The project was completed under budget and on time on December 21, 2004. California's governor, Arnold Schwarzenegger attended the commissioning ceremony at California-ISO's control center in Folsom.
