= Western Area Power Administration =

Power administration in the U.S. Department of Energy

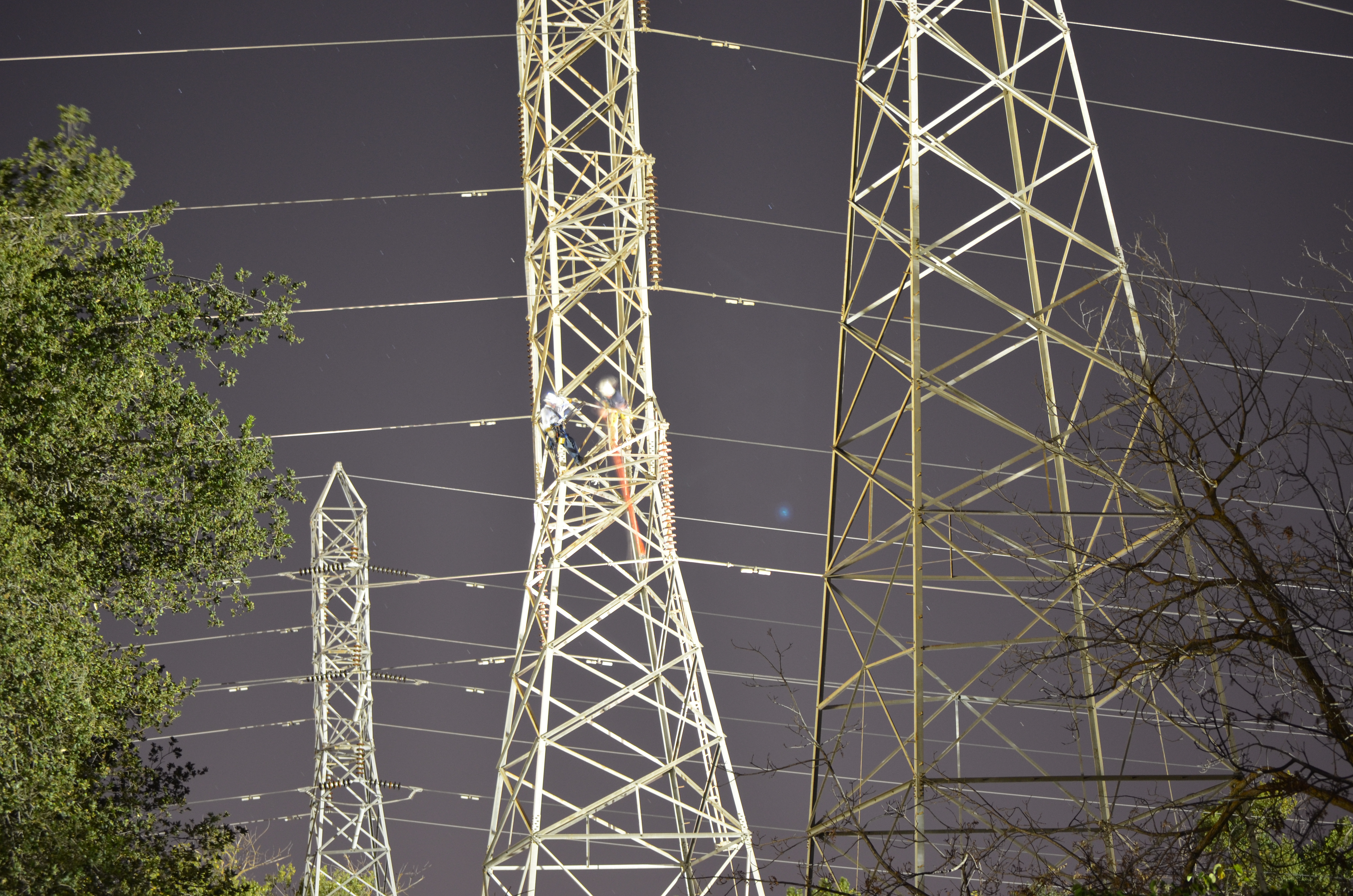
Western Area Power Administration, as one of four power marketing administrations in the U.S. Department of Energy, is responsible for marketing and delivering wholesale federal hydropower to customers in 15 central and western states.

As one of the four power marketing administrations within the U.S. Department of Energy, the Western Area Power Administration (WAPA)'s role is to market wholesale hydropower generated at 57 hydroelectric federal dams operated by the Bureau of Reclamation, United States Army Corps of Engineers and the International Boundary and Water Commission. WAPA delivers this power through a more than 17,000-circuit-mile, high-voltage power transmission system to more than 700 preference power customers across the West. Those customers, in turn, provide retail electric service to more than 40 million consumers. WAPA is headquartered in the Denver, Colorado suburb of Lakewood, Colorado.

WAPA’s service territory spans 15 central and western states, including Arizona, California, Colorado, Iowa, Kansas, Minnesota, Montana, Nebraska, Nevada, New Mexico, North Dakota, South Dakota, Texas, Utah, and Wyoming.

== History ==
WAPA was created in Section 302 of the Department of Energy Organization Act signed into law by President Jimmy Carter, Aug. 4, 1977. Under the statute, WAPA assumed power marketing responsibilities and ownership, operation and maintenance of the federal transmission system from the Bureau of Reclamation. Reclamation retained responsibility for other uses of the multi-purpose water projects, including dam and powerplant construction, operation and maintenance.

== Power marketing ==
WAPA's hydropower resources are produced at federal dams in 11 states, representing about 40 percent of hydroelectric generation in the western and central United States. WAPA also formerly marketed the United States’ 547-megawatt entitlement from the coal-fired Navajo Generating Station near Page, Arizona until its closure on 18 November 2019.

Hydropower is considered a byproduct of the federal dams whose primary purpose is to store water for irrigation and to provide navigation and flood control. Before hydropower, multiple other uses were adopted for federal dams, including municipal and industrial water needs, recreation, salinity control and fish and wildlife. Initial powerplants at the dams were constructed to first serve project-use loads and then to provide revenue from power sales.

WAPA first reserves power to meet project needs called project-use power; this energy powers the facilities at the dams and pumps water at Federal irrigation projects. WAPA then sells the surplus generation at cost-based rates to preference power customers under long-term contracts. Any remaining hydropower is then sold at market-based prices on the short-term spot market.

Cost-based rates are designed to cover annual operations and maintenance and the federal investment in the facilities, plus interest. WAPA only charges market rates when selling surplus hydropower and transmission capacity in the open market after meeting all contractual obligations.

WAPA offers four basic types of contracts:

- long-term firm power and other long term sales
- nonfirm energy and short-term sales and purchases
- seasonal power sales and
- purchase power

WAPA sells the generation from dams and powerplants on a project-specific basis. A project may consist of one large powerplant or the combined generation of several powerplants of varying sizes. Although Congress often determines the definition of a project, WAPA has combined projects into 11 rate-setting systems to sell the power and set rates more effectively and efficiently:

- Boulder Canyon Project
- Central Arizona Project
- Central Valley Project
- Falcon-Amistad Project
- Loveland Area Projects
- Parker-Davis Project
- Pick-Sloan Missouri Basin Program—Eastern Division
- Provo River Project
- Salt Lake City Area Integrated Projects
- Washoe Project

WAPA and its energy-producing partners are separately managed and financed. In addition, each water project maintains a separate financial system and records.

== Transmission system ==
WAPA owns, operates and maintains a more than 17,000-circuit-mile, high-voltage transmission system that represents more than 10 percent of the transmission lines in the Western Electricity Coordinating Council area. The transmission capacity is first reserved to deliver the contractually obligated hydropower to customers. Any other utility may purchase remaining capacity on WAPA’s system on the Open Access, Same-Time Information System.

WAPA’s transmission system includes power lines, substations, power transformers, communication towers, circuit breakers, interconnections and direct-current ties. WAPA personnel both maintain this system and operate balancing authorities, ensuring energy supply matches demand 24 hours a day. WAPA also offers ancillary services to customers to ensure reliable grid operations.

WAPA built several parts of the important Path 15 corridor that connects power grids in the Southwest and Pacific Northwest (the rest was privately built by PG&E). Recently, WAPA helped remedy a transmission bottleneck near Los Banos, California. That bottleneck was one of the reasons for the California electricity crisis in 2000-01. Another important transmission corridor WAPA built was Path 66, paralleling Path 15.

WAPA also owns and operates many electric power substations like the Mead substation to distribute power within the region.

WAPA settled with FERC and NERC for the 2011 Southwest blackout.

== WAPA's customers ==
Various laws, including the Reclamation Project Act of 1939, require WAPA to give preference to certain types of non-profit organizations seeking to purchase Federal power. Preference customers include state and Federal agencies, water and irrigation districts, municipalities, public utility districts, Native American tribes and rural electric cooperatives. A law may also designate specific entities that must receive preference in power sales from a particular powerplant or project. WAPA has some discretion regarding which preference entities should receive power and has allocated power to wildlife refuges, universities and mass transit systems.

Sometimes, legislation specifies a geographic area that receives priority to Federal hydropower. WAPA also places geographic limits on the marketing of power, which define the location of eligible customers. Marketing area boundaries are usually based on past marketing practices, the location of the powerplants generating the electricity being sold, state boundary lines or river drainages.

== Transmission Infrastructure Program ==
Section 402 of the American Recovery and Reinvestment Act of 2009 amended the Hoover Power Plant Act of 1984 to give WAPA authority to borrow up to $3.25 billion from the U.S. Treasury to pursue transmission projects that promote the delivery of renewable generation into the electric transmission grid.

To implement that authority, WAPA created the Transmission Infrastructure Program (TIP). Two projects have been completed under this authority, and several others are in the development process.

== Agency organization ==
WAPA employees conduct power sales, transmission operations and maintenance and engineering services at 51 duty stations organized under four regions, a management center and headquarters. The regions and management centers oversee the power and transmission contracts, operations and maintenance while centralized functions, such as finance, information technology, safety and security, are handled by headquarters.

The core offices are:

- Headquarters, Lakewood, Colorado
- Desert Southwest Regional Office, Phoenix, Arizona
- Rocky Mountain Regional Office, Loveland, Colorado
- Sierra Nevada Regional Office, Folsom, California
- Upper Great Plains Regional Office, Billings, Montana
- Colorado River Storage Project Management Center, Salt Lake City, Utah

Senior executive team

- Administrator and CEO Tracey A. LeBeau
- Executive vice president and chief operating officer Tina Ko (acting)
- Senior VP and chief financial officer Michael Peterson
- Senior VP and chief information officer Michael Montoya
- Senior VP and general counsel Ron Klinefelter (acting)
- Senior VP and assistant administrator for corporate liaison Dionne Thompson
- Senior VP and chief administrative officer and transmission infrastructure program manager Paul Schwabe
- Senior VP and Desert Southwest regional manager Jack Murray
- Senior VP and Rocky Mountain regional manager Barton Barnhart
- Senior VP and Sierra Nevada regional manager Sonja Anderson
- Senior VP and Upper Great Plains regional manager Lloyd Linke
- Senior VP and Colorado River Storage Project Management Center manager Rodney Bailey (acting)
