= Marketplace substation =

Electric substation in Nevada, USA

Coordinates: 35.8192°N 115.0113°W

The Marketplace substation is a major electric power interconnection point in the western United States outside of Boulder City, Nevada. The station is in the Eldorado Valley.

== Interconnects ==
- 500 kV McCullough substation
- 500 kV AC Adelanto substation, 1,291 MW, 202 miles (325 km)
- 500 kV AC Mead substation, continues to Westwing via Perkins Switchyard, 1,923 MW, 256 miles (412 km)

== Power plants ==
- 500 kV Copper Mountain Solar Facility

== Proposed ==
- 500 kV AC Moenkopi substation, 218 miles (351 km), completed

== Future ==
Several high voltage direct current (HVDC) projects include a converter station, which may be connected to Marketplace.
