= Mead substation =

Electric substation in Nevada, USA

Transmission line near Mead Substation

The Mead substation is a major electric power interconnection point in the western United States. The station is located in the El Dorado Valley of Nevada just outside of Boulder City, at the end of Buchanan Boulevard south of its grade separation with Interstate 11. The facility is owned and operated by the Western Area Power Administration.

== Interconnects ==
- 2× 230 kV Amargosa substation (WAPA) to Henderson (8 miles (13 km))
- 230kV Camino substation East line (Metropolitan Water District) Path 58
- 230kV Camino substation West line (Metropolitan Water District)
- 230kV Eldorado substation line 1
- 230kV Eldorado substation line 2
- 2× 230 kV McCullough substation (LADWP)
- 230kV Newport substation line 1 (Colorado River Commission) serving the Southern Nevada Water Authority pumping station (30 miles (48 km))
- 230kV Newport substation line 2 (Colorado River Commission)
- 230 kV etcetera
- 287kV Victorville Path 46
- 345kV to Liberty substation near Phoenix, Arizona (238 miles (383 km))
- 500kv Harry Allen Generating Station Substation (48 miles (77 km))
- 500kV Marketplace substation
- 500kV Perkins substation

== Power plants ==
- 230kV Hoover No. 5, 5 miles (8.0 km)
- 230kV Hoover No. 6, 5 miles (8.0 km)
- 230kV Hoover No. 7, 5 miles (8.0 km)
- 230kV Hoover No. 8, 5 miles (8.0 km)

== Heliport ==
The station includes a heliport located at 35.92998°N 114.83637°W.
