= Path 66 =

Set of power lines in the western United States

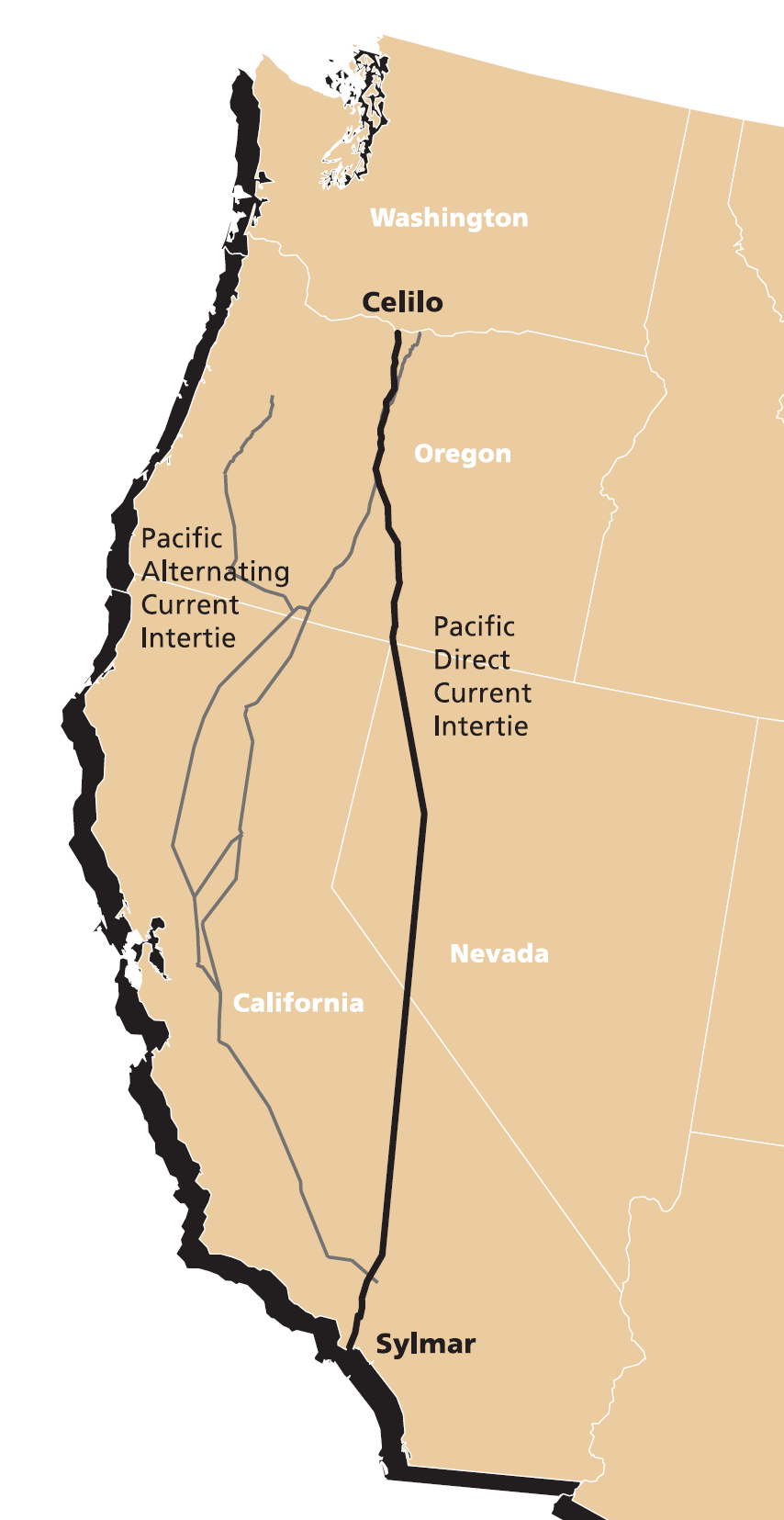
Pacific Intertie transmission routes

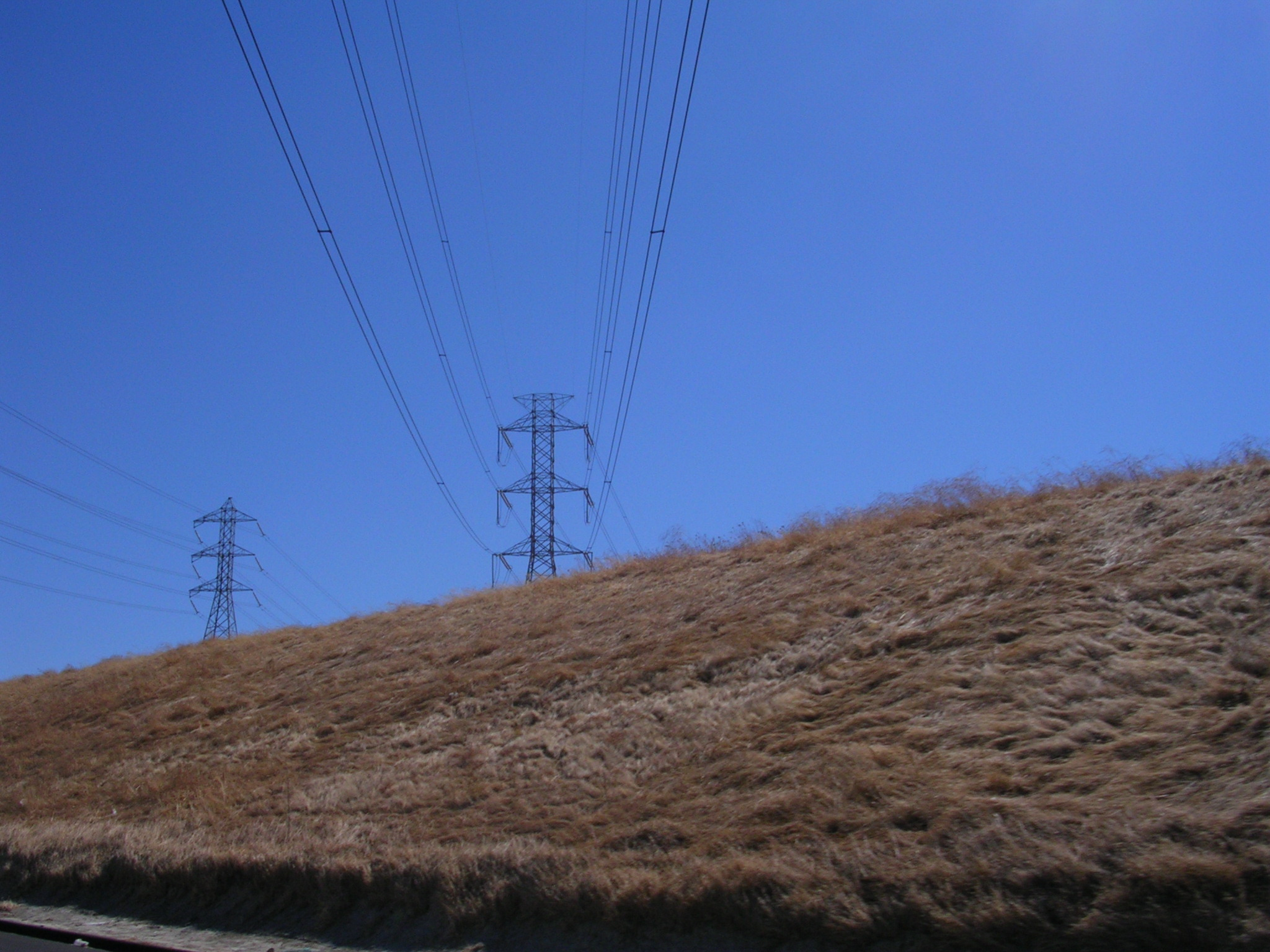
A dual-circuit 500 kV line forming a part of the connection between Path 66 and Path 15.

California Oregon Intertie (COI), identified as Path 66 by Western Electricity Coordinating Council (WECC), is a corridor of three roughly parallel 500 kV alternating current power lines connecting the electric grids of Oregon and California. Their combined power transmission capacity is 4800 MW.

Two of the power lines run from Malin Substation (42°0′20.7″N 121°18′59.7″W) southeast of Klamath Falls, Oregon to Round Mountain Substation northeast of Redding, California. One of them is owned by Western Area Power Administration, with the other owned by Pacific Gas and Electric and PacifiCorp jointly. These lines are a part of Pacific AC Intertie and were completed in the 1960s. The third line runs from Captain Jack Substation near Malin to Olinda Substation south of Redding. It is a part of California-Oregon Transmission Project. The project manager is the Transmission Agency of Northern California (TANC), a joint venture of several public utilities. The line was completed in 1993.

== Route ==
Path 66 is composed of one segment of TANC, PG&E and PacifiCorp 500 kV lines. The TANC line route starts at Captain Jack Substation (42°04′47.1″N 121°23′24.0″W) north of Malin and 6.5 mi (10.5 km) northwest of the Malin Substation, where the other 500 kV lines start (owned by PacifiCorp and PG&E). These substations, just north of the California-Oregon border, link to both the PacifiCorp and Bonneville Power Administration (BPA) grids in the Pacific Northwest.

Path 66 - Captain Jack to Olinda

Path 66 consists of the northernmost segment of TANC's 346-mile (557 km), 500 kV line from Captain Jack substation to Tracy substation in California's Central Valley. Leaving Captain Jack substation, the line first heads southeast as a single-circuit line and runs parallel with the other two 500 kV lines across the Modoc Plateau. It then turns west and climbs in elevation and reaches its highest point near Grizzly Peak at about 6,000 ft (1,830 m). From there, it heads south, spanning over the Stonecoal Valley and the Pit River. Near Round Mountain, it turns southwest and the line is joined by two 230-kV lines as all three lines head into the Sacramento Valley. As the line passes by Cottonwood, it turns west and crosses Interstate 5. Near Olinda, it turns south and enters Olinda substation. Here the line interconnects with transmission lines carrying power from Shasta Dam and Keswick Dam.

Connecting wires to Path 15 – Olinda to Tracy

From Olinda Substation, the TANC 500 kV continues as a single-circuit line, although the tower structures change (see photos below) to a two-level pylon. The line proceeds south and then southeast along the western edge of the Sacramento Valley. It parallels Interstate 5 (about 4 miles (6.4 km) to the west) on its way south, although it is barely visible. It also parallels two 230-kV Pacific Gas and Electric lines for much of this segment and another WAPA 230 kV line. There is a series capacitor station near Maxwell in Colusa County to boost the line across the long Olinda-Tracy segment.

The line crosses the two separated PG&E 500-kV lines, near Woodland and Rio Vista. Near Antioch the line turns and runs parallel with the two PG&E 500 kV lines. All three lines cross both the Sacramento and San Joaquin Rivers on very large pylons. The TANC line turns away from the PG&E lines and heads for another large substation near Tracy.

Connecting wires to Path 15 – Tracy to intersection with PG&E wire

From Tracy Substation, the line again is a rare, tall, double-circuit 500 kV line suspended by a three-level pylon located in the San Joaquin Valley. The line terminates where it intersects with one of the two PG&E 500 kV lines as the PG&E heads south from the Tesla substation towards Los Banos Substation. The PG&E line that the dual-circuit line intersects used to be a second Los Banos-Tesla power line that was split apart. A PG&E tower was removed, although the foundation for the tower is still visible. New towers were built to accompany the line changes. One circuit turns north back into Tesla Substation, effectively linking the Tracy Substation with the Tesla Substation. The other circuit turns south to head for the Los Banos Substation as a southern extension of the third 500 kV line.

Path 66 – Malin to Round Mountain

The other two 500 kV lines start in the Malin substation southeast of the Captain Jack substation. One circuit of a rare, tall BPA dual-circuit and one single-circuit 500 kV line connect Captain Jack substation with Malin substation. The PG&E and PacifiCorp 500 kV line both head south together across the Modoc Plateau, generally following the lone WAPA line at a distance. The parallel lines then turn southwestward climb to about 5,400 feet (1,600 m), before descending and turning south once again. Both lines enter the Round Mountain substation. This is the terminus of the Path 66 portion of the parallel 500 kV wires.

=== Substations ===
Path 66

TANC line (North to South)

- Captain Jack
- Olinda

PG&E and PacifiCorp

- Malin
- Round Mountain

Connecting power line

- Series capacitor station in Colusa County
- Tracy

== Issues ==
Power transmission capacity

Path 66 can transmit 4,800 MW of electrical power from north to south. From south to north, the system can transmit only 3,675 MW of power.

Environmental impacts

The northern part of this electrical transmission corridor (including Path 15) is visible from space and Google Earth as lines of bare, treeless ground. This is because the power lines here run through forests of conifer trees which appear dark green-green from space. The land through here has been logged and sometimes clear-cut to create a right-of-way for the power lines because a wildfire could start when an electrical arc occurs between the wires and a tree if they come close enough to each other.

== Tower design and differences ==
This TANC 500 kV power line, unlike its PG&E counterparts, is triple-bundled, meaning that it has three wires per phase, whereas the PG&E lines are only double-bundled, or two wires per phase. In addition, the tower's design is strikingly different from the lighter and wider PG&E tower, and the design also changes significantly as one goes from north to south on WAPA's 346-mile (557 km), 500 kV line.

The TANC line changes design at the Olinda substation from the delta pylon pictured at the Interstate 5 crossing to the two-level pylon pictured above. This is because much of the segment between the Olinda and Tracy substations was constructed by upgrading an existing double-circuit 230 kV line. The segment of TANC's 500 kV line from the Sacramento River crossing south to the Tracy Substation has delta pylons like those found on the Captain Jack-Olinda segment, although they are slightly different. This is because south of the Sacramento River crossing, the original 230 kV line paralleled the two PG&E 500 kV lines almost all the way to Tracy Substation. In order to meet separation requirements, a new alignment for the 500 kV line had to be built some distance to the east, with the exception of the San Joaquin River crossing, which uses the former 230 kV facilities. This alignment can be seen from Highway 4 and the western part of the San Joaquin River portion of the Sacramento River Delta. A portion of the former 230-kV line south of the Sacramento River remains in service today as part of the 69 kV system that serves the pumping stations on the Contra Costa Canal.

As for the pylons of the PG&E and PacifiCorp Round Mountain-Malin parallel lines, the PG&E line uses the same tower type as the PG&E Table Mountain-Round Mountain 500 kV segment does. The PacifiCorp 500 kV line uses a pylon that looks similar to the pylon used in WAPA's Olinda-Captain Jack segment.

Visual reference

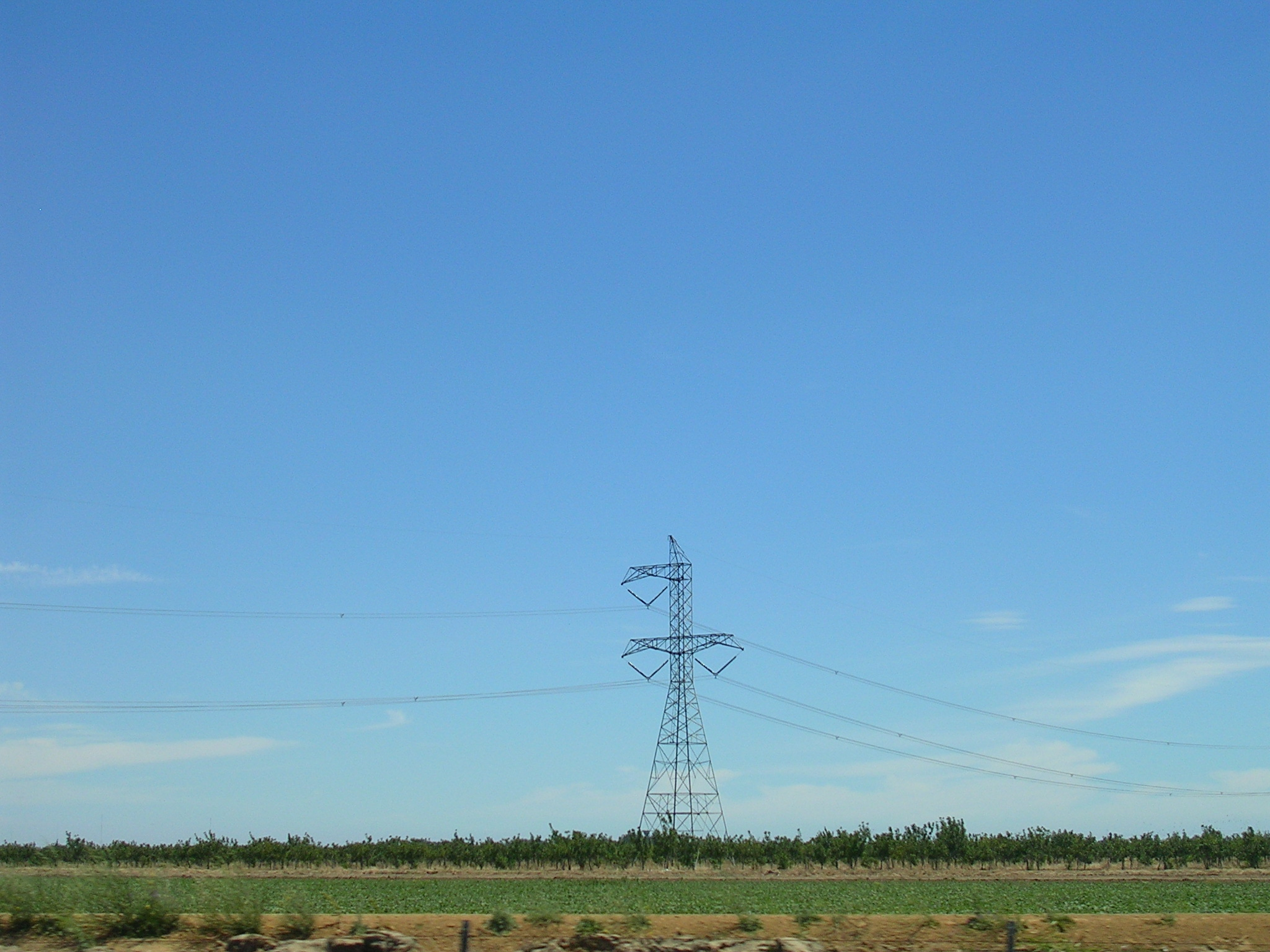
WAPA Olinda-Tracy 500 kV transmission line outside of Vacaville, near Interstate 80.

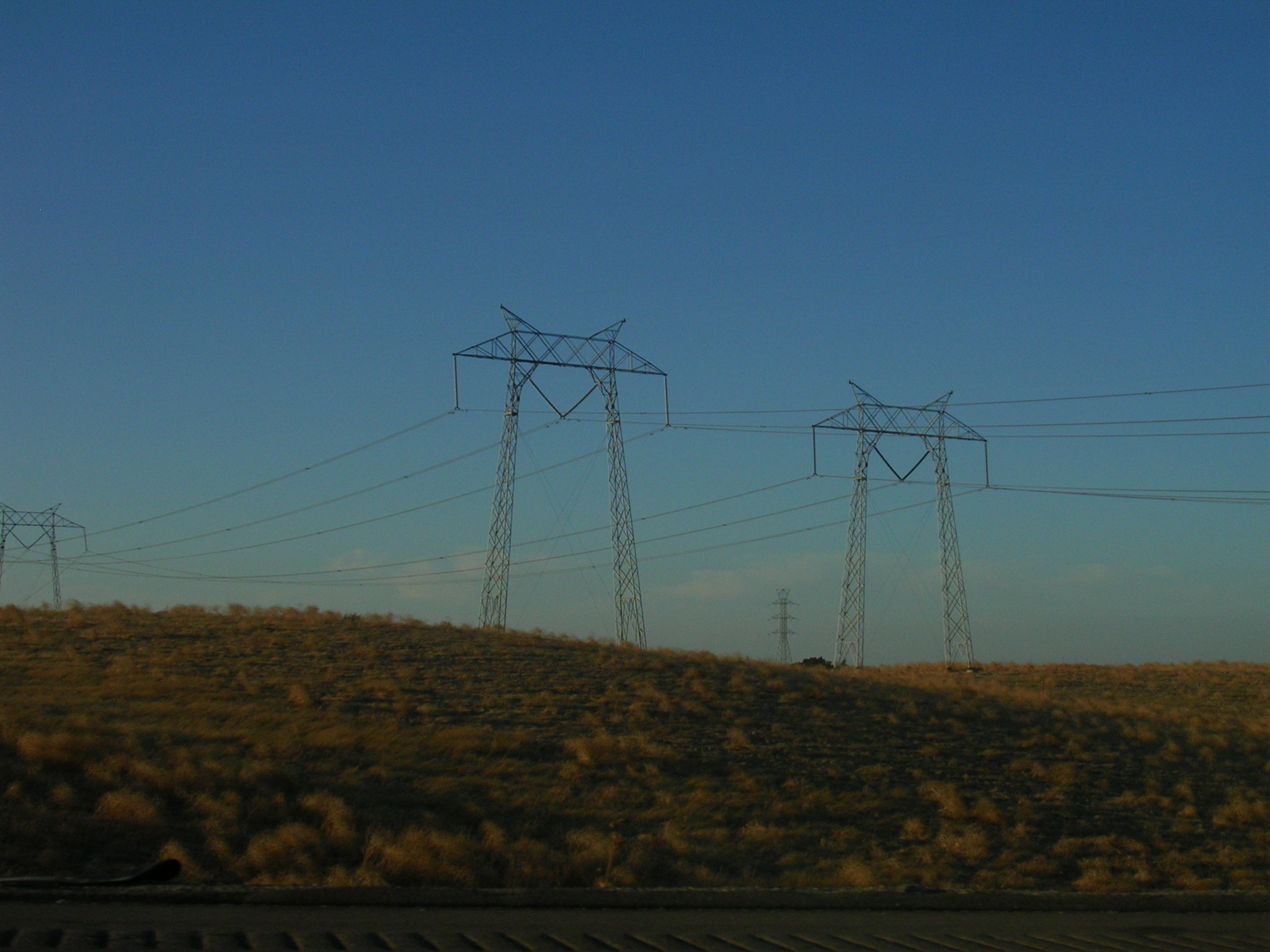
PG&E wires near Tracy.

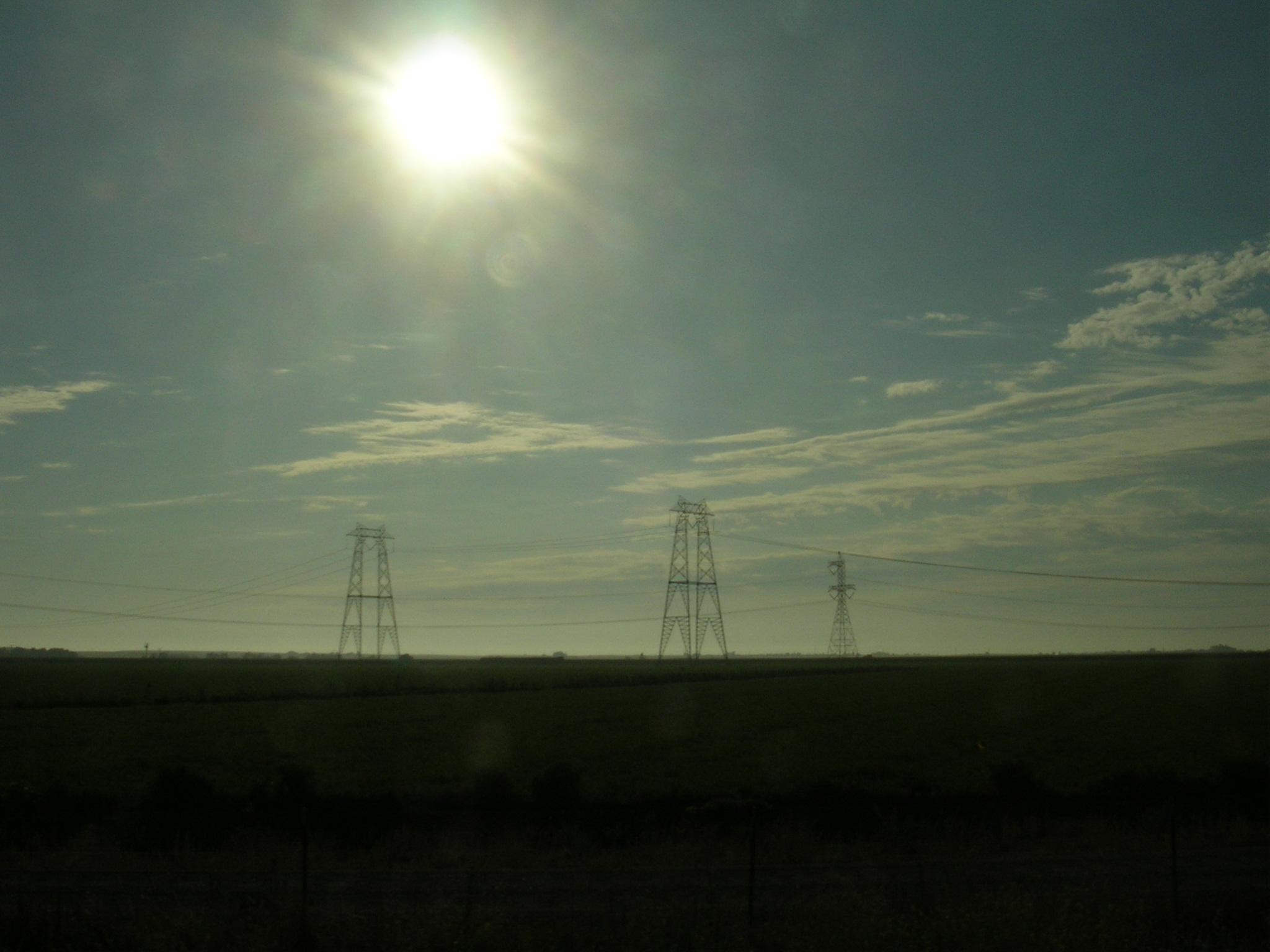
PG&E 500 kV Table Mountain-Vaca Dixon line spanning over the WAPA line (Olinda-Tracy segment).

== Problems ==
Since TANC's Captain Jack-Olinda 500 kV wire rises to almost 6,000 feet (1,800 m) as the line crosses the rugged mountains near Grizzly Peak, that section of 500 kV line is covered with large amounts of snow during the winter. Despite its location far from the Pacific Ocean, 20 feet (6 m) of snow can accumulate near Grizzly Peak's 6,250-foot (1,905 m) summit. The extreme snowfall there can cause ice and snow to accumulate on the insulators and the wires and sometimes lead to power outages when the wires snap in these extreme conditions. This high-elevation segment of 500 kV line is also said to be problematic.

== Map ==
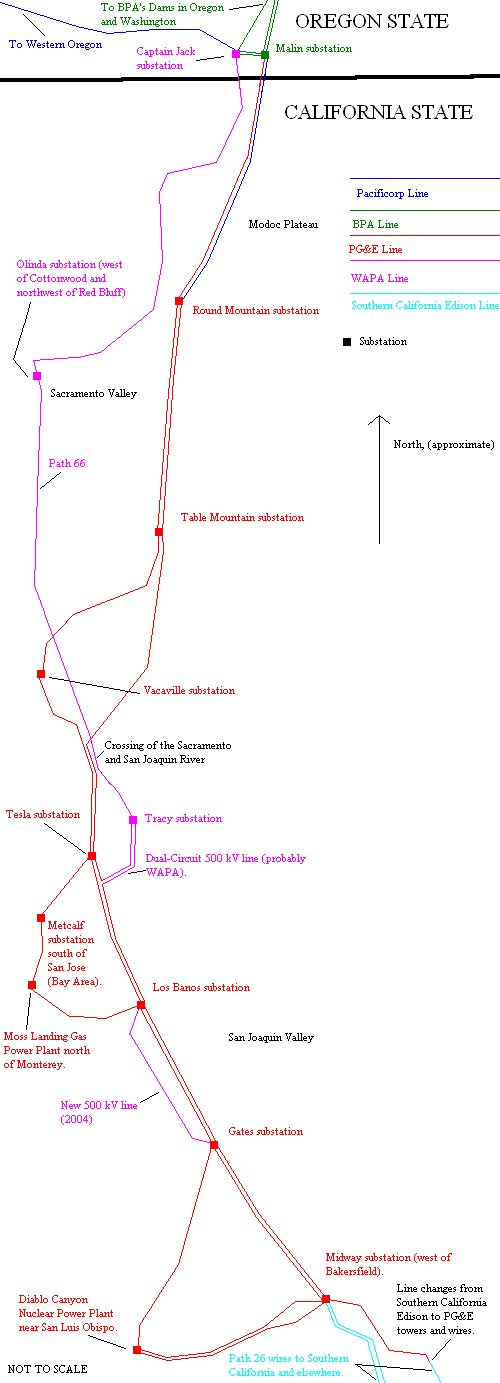
Map of Path 66 located in the upper section, left of the other two 500 kV lines south of Round Mountain substation

== See also ==
- Path 26
