= Path 61 =

Set of power lines in southern California

Path 61 or the Lugo - Victorville 500 kV Line is a relatively short AC 500 kV power line that runs from Southern California Edison's (SCE) Lugo substation southwest of Hesperia to Los Angeles Department of Water and Power's (LADWP) Victorville substation north of Victorville, California. Path 61 is part of the Western Electricity Coordinating Council's links of electrical intertie paths in the western United States. This line is an important connection between two out of the four parts that make up the massive Path 46 transmission system in southeast California since the line allows power flow to be rerouted on Path 46 when necessary. Half of the length of the 500 kV power line is owned by SCE to the south and LADWP to the north. The entire line is located in the Mojave Desert and the High Desert regions of California.

== Route ==
Starting from the SCE Lugo substation, where many other Southern California Edison power transmission lines interconnect, the Path 61 500 kV power line heads north-northeast along with other lower voltage 220 kV and 230 kV power lines for a short distance before turning northwest, traveling though the southwestern portion of Hesperia and spanning over Interstate 15 about 2 miles north of the interchange with Main Street. North of Bear Valley Road, the line turns and travels northeast along with the Hoover Dam-Victorville-Century 287 kV transmission lines until they terminates at the LADWP Victorville substation. Like at the Lugo substation, many other LADWP 500 kV lines, which are also part of Path 46, interconnect at the Victorville substation. Victorville is also near the Adelanto Converter Station where the Intermountain DC link comes in from Utah.

== Power transmission capacity ==
Path 61 can transmit 2,400 MW of electrical power from Victorville substation to Lugo substation. In reverse (Lugo to Victorville), the power line can only transmit 900 MW.
