= List of power stations in Oklahoma =

Sources of Oklahoma utility-scale electricity generation in gigawatt-hours, full-year 2025:
1. Natural gas: 40,666 (44.7%)
2. Wind: 38,031 (41.8%)
3. Coal: 9,414 (10.4%)
4. Hydroelectric: 1,740 (1.91%)
5. Solar: 723 (0.80%)
6. Biomass: 317 (0.35%)
7. Petroleum: 35 (0.04%)

This is a list of electricity-generating power stations in the U.S. state of Oklahoma, sorted by type and name. In 2024, Oklahoma had a total summer capacity of 31.9 GW through all of its power plants, and a net generation of 94,069 GWh. In 2025, the electrical energy generation mix was 44.7% natural gas, 41.8% wind, 10.4% coal, 1.9% hydroelectric, 0.8% solar, and less than 1% combined from biomass and petroleum.

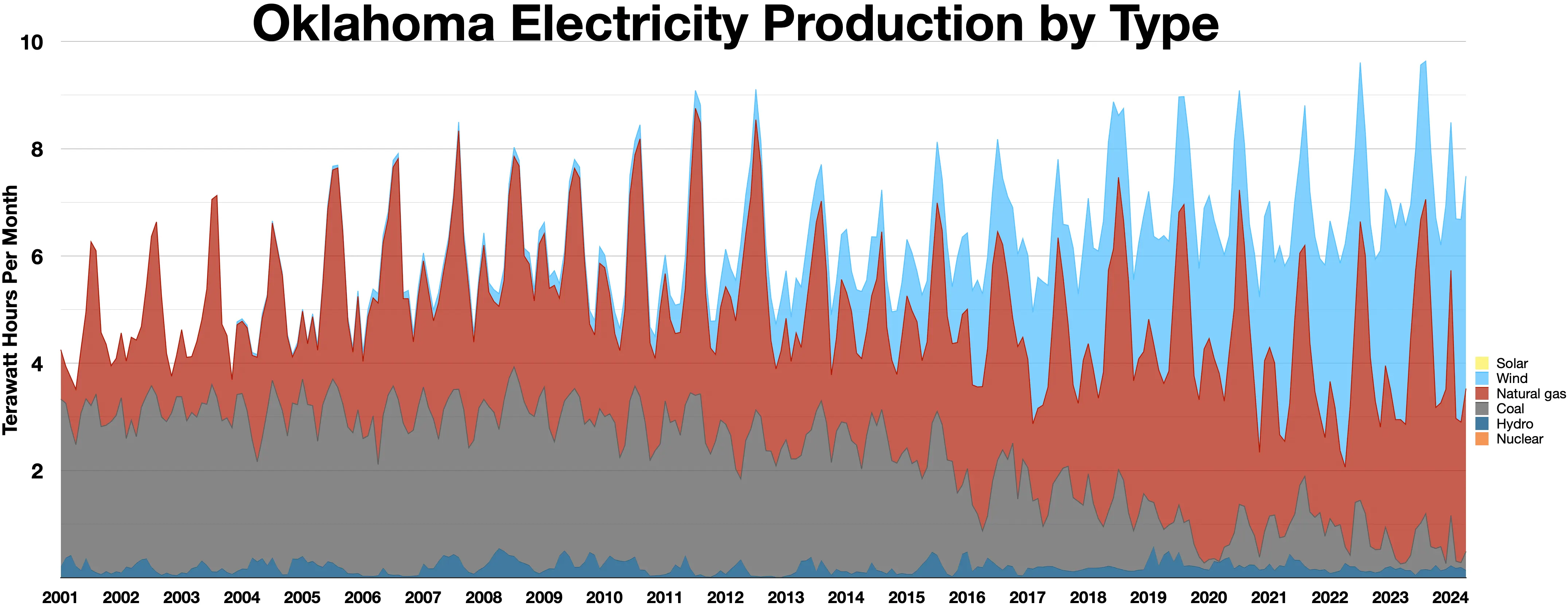
Oklahoma electricity production by type

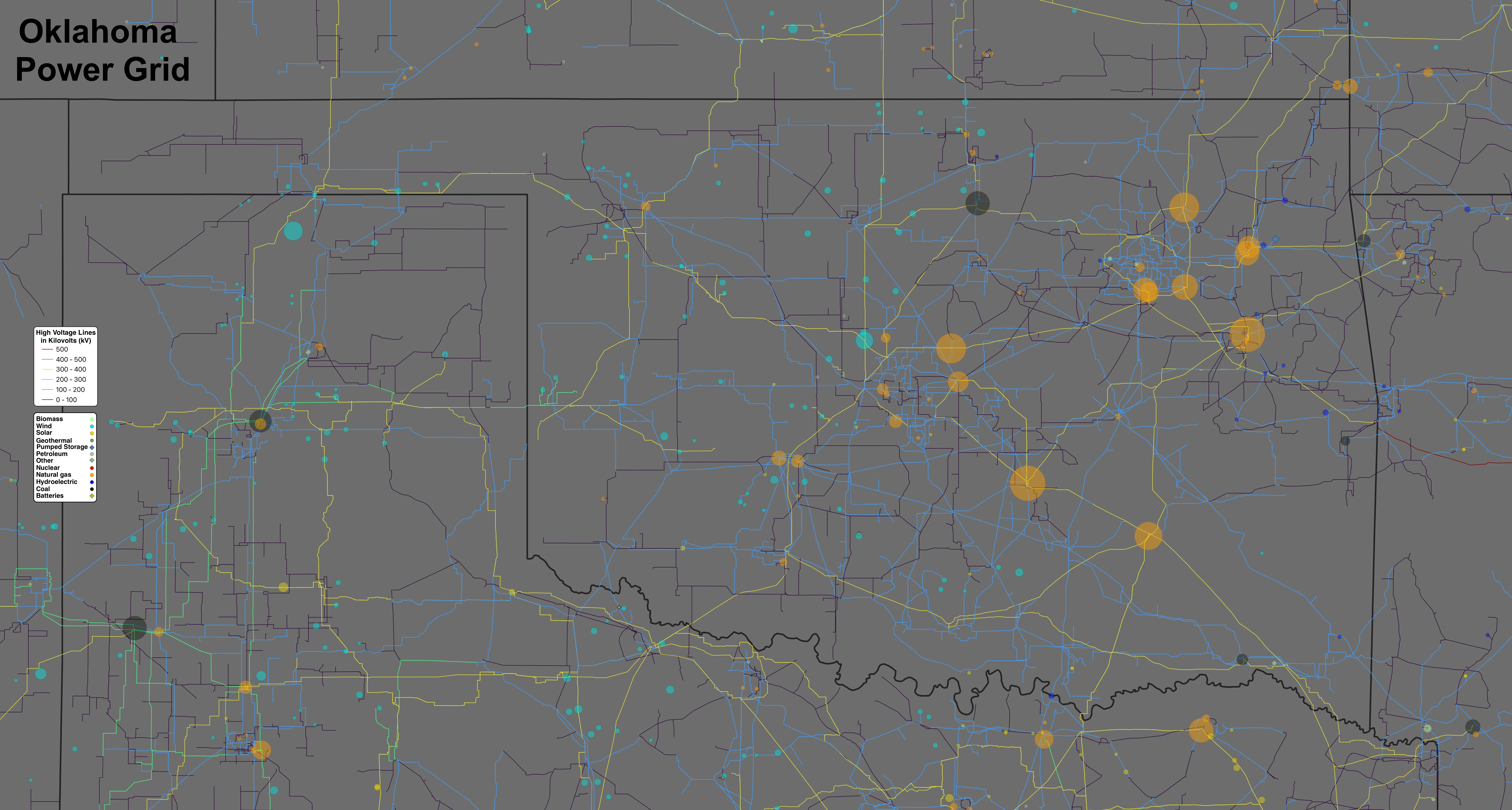
Oklahoma power grid

== Fossil-fuel power stations ==
=== Coal-fired ===
Name	Location	Coordinates	Capacity (MW)	Year completed	Scheduled retirement	Refs
River Valley Generating Station	Le Flore County	35°11′35″N 94°38′45″W	350	1990 - Unit 1; 1990 - Unit 2		
Grand River Energy Center	Mayes County	36°11′25″N 95°17′22″W	594.0	1985		
Muskogee Generating Station	Muskogee County	35°45′41″N 95°17′14″W	572.0	1984		
Hugo Power Plant	Choctaw County	34°0′57″N 95°19′14″W	446.0	1982		
Sooner Generating Station	Noble County	36°27′11″N 97°3′10″W	1,138.0	Unit 1 - 1979; Unit 2 - 1980		
Northeastern Station	Rogers County	36°25′54″N 95°42′3″W	473.0	1979		

=== Natural gas-fired ===
Name	Location	Coordinates	Capacity (MW)	Generation type	Year completed	Refs
Grand River Energy Center	Mayes County	36°11′25″N 95°17′22″W	600.3	Combined cycle (x2)	2017 - Unit 3ST; 2017 - Unit 3CT	
Mustang Energy Center	Canadian County	35°28′12″N 97°40′30″W	462.0	Combustion turbine (x7)	2017	
Stillwater Energy Center	Payne County	36°9′43″N 97°2′13″W	56.4	Internal combustion engine (x3)	2016	
Charles D. Lamb Energy Center	Kay County	36°48′50″N 97°7′31″W	122.0	Combustion turbine	2015	
Chouteau Power Plant	Mayes County	36°13′19″N 95°16′37″W	1,069.6	Combined cycle (x6)	Unit 1 - 2000; Unit 2 - 2000; Unit 3 - 2000; Unit 4 - 2011; Unit 5 - 2011; Unit 6 - 2011	
Anadarko Plant	Caddo County	35°5′5″N 98°13′48″W	534.9	Combustion turbine (x3), steam turbine (x3), combined cycle (x3)	Unit 1 - 1953; Unit 2 - 1953; Unit 3 - 1959; Unit 4 - 1977; Unit 5 - 1977; Unit 6 - 1977; Unit 10 - 2009; Unit 11 - 2009; Unit 9 - 2009	
Riverside Generating Station	Tulsa County	35°59′52″N 95°57′24″W	1,119.0	Combustion turbine (x2), steam turbine (x2)	Unit 1 - 1974; Unit 2 - 1976; Unit 3 - 2008; Unit 4 - 2008	
Southwestern Power Plant	Caddo County	35°6′3″N 98°21′9″W	656.0	Steam turbine (x3), combustion turbine (x2)	Unit 1 - 1952; Unit 2 - 1954; Unit 3 - 1967; Unit 4 - 2008; Unit 5 - 2008	
Waynoka Gas Processing Plant	Woods County	36°39′4″N 98°45′56″W	3.9	Internal combustion engine (x3)	2006	
Redbud Power Plant	Oklahoma County	35°41′8″N 97°13′35″W	1,433.6	Combined cycle (x8)	2004	
Oneta Energy Center	Wagoner County	36°0′43″N 95°41′48″W	1,214.0	Combined cycle (x6)	Unit CTG1 - 2002; Unit CTG2 - 2002; Unit STG1 - 2002; Unit CTG3 - 2003; Unit CTG4 - 2003; Unit STG2 - 2003	
Ponca City Power Plant	Kay County	36°43′11″N 97°5′9″W	182.3	Combined cycle (x2), combustion turbine	Unit 1 - 1966; Unit 2 - 1977; Unit 3 - 1995; Unit 4 - 2003	
Kiamichi Energy Facility	Pittsburg County	34°40′59″N 95°56′6″W	1,370.0	Combined cycle (x6)	2003	
Green Country Energy	Tulsa County	35°59′0″N 95°56′5″W	903.9	Combined cycle (x6)	2002	
Spring Creek Power Plant	Logan County	35°44′32″N 97°39′18″W	338.0	Combustion turbine (x4)	2001	
Horseshoe Lake Power Plant	Oklahoma County	35°30′31″N 97°10′47″W	565.0	Combustion turbine (x2), steam turbine	Unit 8 - 1969; Unit 10 - 2001; Unit 9 - 2001	
WFEC GenCo	Caddo County	35°5′0″N 98°13′35″W	90.0	Combustion turbine (x2)	2001	
Northeastern Station	Rogers County	36°25′54″N 95°42′3″W	1,000.0	Combined cycle (x3), steam turbine	Unit 1 - 1961; Unit 2 - 1970; Unit 1A - 2001; Unit 1B - 2001	
McClain Energy Facility	McClain County	35°17′52″N 97°35′23″W	551.3	Combined cycle (x3)	2001	
Frontier Power Plant	Oklahoma County	35°26′31″N 97°38′53″W	131.4	Combined cycle (x3)	1989	
University of Oklahoma Power Plant	Cleveland County	35°12′32″N 97°26′33″W	16.8	Steam turbine (x4)	Unit GEN2 - 1949; Unit GEN3 - 1949; Unit GEN1 - 1964; Unit GEN4 - 1985	
Muskogee Mill Power Plant	Muskogee County	35°43′56″N 95°17′38″W	114.0	Steam turbine (x3)	Unit GEN1 - 1979; Unit GEN2 - 1980; Unit GEN3 - 1982	
Muskogee Generating Station	Muskogee County	35°45′41″N 95°17′14″W	1,144.0	Steam turbine (x2)	Unit 4 - 1977; Unit 5 - 1978	
Weleetka Gas Plant	Okfuskee County	35°19′24″N 96°8′7″W	106.0	Combustion turbine (x2)	Unit 4 - 1975; Unit 5 - 1976	
Seminole Power Plant	Seminole County	34°57′59″N 96°43′33″W	1,701.0	Steam turbine (x3)	Unit 1 - 1971; Unit 2 - 1973; Unit 3 - 1975	
Mooreland	Woodward County	36°26′14″N 99°13′32″W	305.0	Steam turbine (x3)	Unit 1 - 1964; Unit 2 - 1968; Unit 3 - 1975	
Comanche Power Plant	Comanche County	34°32′35″N 98°19′28″W	290.0	Combined cycle (x3)	Unit 1G1 - 1973; Unit 1G2 - 1973; Unit 1S - 1974	
Tinker Air Force Base Plant	Oklahoma County	35°24′53″N 97°22′24″W	82.0	Combustion turbine (x2)	1971	
Kingfisher	Kingfisher County	35°51′27″N 97°55′40″W	9.1	Internal combustion engine (x5)	Unit IC1 - 1954; Unit IC2 - 1954; Unit 4 - 1959; Unit 3 - 1965; Unit 5 - 1970	
Tulsa Power Station	Tulsa County	36°6′59″N 95°59′27″W	340.0	Steam turbine (x2)	Unit 2 - 1956; Unit 4 - 1958	

=== Petroleum-fired ===
Name	Location	Coordinates	Capacity (MW)	Year completed	Refs
Cana Gas Processing Plant	Canadian County	35°31′59″N 98°6′4″W	7.5	Unit 3005 - 2010; Unit 3006 - 2010; Unit 6214 - 2012	
Laverne Diesel Generating Plant	Harper County	36°42′38″N 99°53′26″W	4.0	2006	
Boomer Lake Station	Payne County	36°8′38″N 97°4′5″W	6.0	2004	
Stillwater Water Treatment Plant	Payne County	36°12′14″N 97°4′26″W	2.0	2003	
University of Oklahoma	Cleveland County	35°12′32″N 97°26′33″W	1.8	2001	
Cushing Power Plant	Payne County	35°58′57″N 96°46′32″W	24.6	1936 - Unit 3; 1936 - Unit 4; 1936 - Unit 5; 1939 - Unit 6; 1949 - Unit 2; 1956 - Unit 1; 1956 - Unit 7; 1956 - Unit 8; 1965 - Unit 9; 1972 - Unit 10; 1988 - Unit 11	
Northeastern Station	Rogers County	36°25′54″N 95°42′3″W	4.5	1980	
Riverside Generating Station	Tulsa County	35°59′52″N 95°57′24″W	2.7	1976	
Mangum Power Plant	Greer County	34°53′1″N 99°30′8″W	6.7	Unit 1 - 1946; Unit 4 - 1956; Unit 5 - 1963; Unit 6 - 1969	
Tulsa Power Station	Tulsa County	36°6′59″N 95°59′27″W	8.2	1967	
Southwestern	Caddo County	35°6′3″N 98°21′9″W	2.0	1966	
Pawhuska Power Plant	Osage County	36°40′10″N 96°20′51″W	9.0	Unit 1 - 1949; Unit 2 - 1954; Unit 5 - 1960; Unit 3 - 1966	
Weleetka Gas Plant	Okfuskee County	35°19′24″N 96°8′7″W	4.0	1963	
Comanche Power Plant	Comanche County	34°32′35″N 98°19′28″W	4.0	1962	

== Renewable power stations ==
Data from the U.S. Energy Information Administration serves as a general reference.

=== Biomass ===
Name	Location	Coordinates	Capacity (MW)	Fuel	Generation type	Year completed	Refs
Tulsa Landfill Gas	Osage County	36°9′43″N 96°11′11″W	3.2	Landfill gas	Reciprocating engine	Unit GEN3M - 2011; Unit GEN4M - 2020	
Covanta Tulsa	Tulsa County	36°7′55″N 96°1′5″W	16.8	Municipal solid waste	Steam turbine	1989	
International Paper Valliant Mill	McCurtain County	33°59′46″N 95°6′41″W	68.0	Wood/wood waste biomass		1971	

=== Hydroelectric ===
Name	Location	Coordinates	Capacity (MW)	Year completed	Refs
Kaw Hydroelectric Plant	Kay County	36°41′58″N 96°55′40″W	37.0	1989	
Webbers Falls	Muskogee County	35°33′11″N 95°10′15″W	60.0	1973	
Robert S. Kerr	Sequoyah County	35°20′40″N 94°46′32″W	110.0	1971	
Salina Pumped Storage Project	Mayes County	36°15′53″N 95°6′13″W	259.2	Unit 1 - 1968; Unit 2 - 1968; Unit 3 - 1968; Unit 4 - 1971; Unit 5 - 1971; Unit 6 - 1971	
Broken Bow Dam	McCurtain County	34°8′20″N 94°41′4″W	100.0	1970	
Keystone Dam	Tulsa County	36°9′3″N 96°15′6″W	70.0	1968	
Eufaula Dam	Haskell County	35°18′25″N 95°21′26″W	90.0	1964	
Markham Ferry	Mayes County	36°13′54″N 95°10′56″W	114.0	1964	
Tenkiller Ferry	Sequoyah County	35°35′42″N 95°3′4″W	39.0	1953	
Fort Gibson Dam	Cherokee County	35°52′9″N 95°13′37″W	44.8	1953	
Pensacola Dam	Mayes County	36°28′3″N 95°2′29″W	130.1	Unit 1 - 1940; Unit 2 - 1940; Unit 3 - 1940; Unit 4 - 1940; Unit A - 1940; Unit 5 - 1946; Unit 6 - 1946	

=== Wind farms ===
Name	Location	Coordinates	Capacity (MW)	Year completed	Refs
Caddo Wind	Caddo County	34°59′6″N 98°23′2″W	303.6	2022	
Rockhaven Wind Project	Garvin County	34°28′30″N 97°21′41″W	140.0	2021	
Glass Sands Wind Facility	Murray County	34°30′51″N 96°54′57″W	117.0	2021	
Maverick Wind Project	Major County	36°17′38″N 98°9′53″W	288.0	2021	
Frontier Windpower II	Kay County	36°49′29″N 97°1′47″W	351.8	2021	
Sundance Wind Project	Woods County	36°33′35″N 98°44′57″W	199.0	2021	
Traverse Wind Energy Center	Custer County	35°33′N 98°41′W	999	2022	
Diamond Spring	Johnston County	34°29′15″N 96°46′50″W	303.5	2020	
Skeleton Creek Energy Center Hybrid	Garfield County	36°31′17″N 98°2′4″W	250.0	2020	
Boiling Springs Wind Farm	Woodward County	36°32′48″N 99°21′27″W	148.4	2020	
King Plains Wind Project	Garfield County	36°24′1″N 97°28′39″W	248.2	2020	
Ponderosa Wind Energy Center	Beaver County	36°33′20″N 100°40′8″W	200.0	2020	
Wildhorse Mountain Wind Facility	Pushmataha County	34°35′28″N 95°11′31″W	100.0	2019	
Red Dirt Wind Project	Kingfisher County	36°6′0″N 97°48′0″W	299.3	2018	
Thunder Ranch Wind Project	Noble County	36°33′3″N 97°3′32″W	297.8	2018	
Minco Wind IV	Canadian County	35°22′52″N 98°16′10″W	130.0	2018	
Persimmon Creek Wind Farm 1	Woodward County	36°10′27″N 99°20′57″W	198.6	2018	
Armadillo Flats Wind Project	Garfield County	36°18′3″N 97°34′1″W	247.3	2018	
Rock Falls Wind Farm	Kay County	36°55′38″N 97°25′38″W	154.5	2017	
Redbed Plains Wind Farm	Grady County	35°17′27″N 97°51′14″W	99.1	2017	
Drift Sand Wind Project	Grady County	34°49′40″N 97°57′26″W	108.0	2016	
Kingfisher Wind	Kingfisher County	35°46′13″N 97°47′59″W	298.0	2016	
Grant Wind	Grant County	36°55′37″N 97°41′47″W	151.8	2016	
Chisholm View Wind Project	Garfield County	36°34′29″N 97°40′25″W	300.0	Unit 1 - 2012; Unit 2 - 2016	
Great Western Wind Energy	Ellis County	36°9′59″N 99°35′46″W	225.0	2016	
Grant Plains Wind	Grant County	36°58′15″N 97°42′19″W	147.2	2016	
Bluestem Wind	Beaver County	36°33′8″N 100°35′15″W	198.0	2016	
Frontier Windpower	Kay County	36°50′20″N 97°10′52″W	200.0	2016	
Rush Springs Wind	Stephens County	34°40′58″N 97°49′45″W	249.9	2016	
Kay Wind	Kay County	36°59′3″N 97°8′1″W	299.0	2015	
Goodwell Wind Project	Texas County	36°32′29″N 101°33′56″W	200.0	2015	
Little Elk Wind Project	Washita County	35°11′41″N 98°54′26″W	74.0	2015	
Arbuckle Mountain Wind Farm	Murray County	34°23′13″N 97°8′13″W	100.0	2015	
Balko Wind	Beaver County	36°31′5″N 100°50′50″W	299.7	2015	
Breckinridge Wind Project	Garfield County	36°28′37″N 97°41′8″W	98.8	2015	
Osage Wind	Osage County	36°42′25″N 96°42′1″W	150.4	2015	
Seiling Wind II	Dewey County	36°7′21″N 98°59′32″W	98.6	2014	
Origin Wind	Murray County	34°26′46″N 97°16′11″W	150.0	2014	
Mammoth Plains	Dewey County	35°58′44″N 98°42′37″W	199.0	2014	
Seiling Wind I	Dewey County	36°7′21″N 98°59′32″W	199.0	2014	
Canadian Hills Wind	Canadian County	35°37′47″N 98°1′29″W	298.5	2012	
Minco Wind III	Caddo County	35°22′20″N 98°10′58″W	100.8	2012	
NextEra-Blackwell Wind	Kay County	36°50′48″N 97°25′3″W	59.8	2012	
KODE Novus II	Texas County	36°32′56″N 101°29′45″W	40.0	2012	
KODE Novus I	Texas County	36°32′38″N 101°23′37″W	80.0	2012	
Rocky Ridge Wind Project	Kiowa County	35°8′8″N 99°0′11″W	148.8	2012	
Dempsey Ridge Wind Farm	Roger Mills County	35°31′47″N 99°48′52″W	132.0	2012	
Crossroads Wind Farm	Dewey County	36°2′6″N 98°43′20″W	227.5	2012	
Blue Canyon Windpower VI	Caddo County	34°54′37″N 98°33′36″W	99.8	2011	
Minco Wind II	Grady County	35°19′31″N 98°4′17″W	100.8	2011	
Taloga Wind	Dewey County	35°51′20″N 98°58′6″W	130.0	2011	
Minco Wind I	Grady County	35°16′49″N 97°58′32″W	99.2	2010	
Elk City Wind	Roger Mills County	35°27′51″N 99°53′54″W	198.1	Unit 1 - 2009; Unit 2 - 2010	
Keenan II Wind Farm	Woodward County	36°16′34″N 99°29′27″W	151.8	2010	
OU Spirit Wind Farm	Woodward County	36°20′2″N 99°28′49″W	101.2	2009	
Blue Canyon Windpower V	Caddo County	34°49′18″N 98°27′9″W	99.0	2009	
Red Hills Wind Farm	Roger Mills County	35°32′6″N 99°22′58″W	123.0	2008	
Buffalo Bear	Harper County	36°46′36″N 99°38′7″W	18.9	2008	
Sleeping Bear	Harper County	36°38′25″N 99°30′2″W	94.5	2007	
Centennial Wind Farm	Harper County	36°38′16″N 99°36′7″W	120.0	2006	
Blue Canyon Windpower II	Comanche County	34°51′58″N 98°36′20″W	151.4	2005	
Weatherford Wind Energy Center	Custer County	35°30′34″N 98°44′5″W	147.0	2005	
Blue Canyon Windpower I	Comanche County	34°51′3″N 98°34′38″W	74.3	2003	
Oklahoma Wind Energy Center	Woodward County	36°36′14″N 99°20′24″W	102.0	2003	

=== Solar farms ===
Name	Location	Coordinates	Capacity (MW_{AC})	Year completed	Refs
Norman Solar	Cleveland County	35°13′37″N 97°21′37″W	5.0	2021	
Choctaw Nation Solar Farm	Bryan County	33°58′8″N 96°26′4″W	5.0	2020	
Chickasaw Nation Solar Farm	Murray County	34°28′39″N 97°6′19″W	5.0	2020	
Covington Solar Farm	Garfield County	36°19′5″N 97°35′9″W	10.0	2018	
Cyril Solar Farm	Caddo County	34°53′53″N 98°13′40″W	5.0	2017	
Tuttle Solar Farm	Grady County	35°16′0″N 97°50′48″W	4.0	2017	
Hinton Solar Farm	Caddo County	35°29′41″N 98°23′8″W	3.0	2017	
Marietta Solar Farm	Love County	33°56′35″N 97°6′31″W	3.0	2017	
Pine Ridge Solar Generation Facility	Caddo County	35°0′48″N 98°26′41″W	3.0	2017	
Mustang Power Plant	Canadian County	35°28′12″N 97°40′30″W	2.5	2015	
