= The Power of Big Oil =

Television documentary series

- Frontline documentary series poster
- Genre: Documentary
- Created by: WGBH
- Developed by: Anthony DeLorenzo
- Written by: Russell Gold
- Directed by: Jane McMullen; Gesbeen Mohammad; Robin Barnwell
- Starring: Al Gore; Chuck Hagel; Bob Inglis; Timothy Wirth
- Narrated by: Will Lyman
- Music by: Louis Dodd; Richard Spiller
- Composers: Martin Brody; Mason Daring
- Country of origin: United States
- Original language: English
- No. of seasons: 1
- No. of episodes: 3

Production
- Executive producers: Raney Aronson-Rath; David Fanning; Sarah Waldron
- Producers: Emma Supple; Sara Obeidat
- Cinematography: Robin Barnwell
- Editors: Ella Newton; Brad Manning; Guy Creasey
- Camera setup: Single
- Running time: 54–85 minutes
- Production companies: Frontline; Mongoose Pictures; BBC; Arte

Original release
- Network: PBS
- Release: April 19 – May 3, 2022

The Power of Big Oil is a three-part 2022 documentary miniseries produced by WGBH for the investigative documentary television program Frontline, which airs in the United States on PBS. It is an examination of what the public, businesses, governments, and scientists have known for decades on climate change, as well as the numerous opportunities that were lost to help mitigate the issue.

The episodes called Denial, Doubt, and Delay, examine how industry was researching climate change as early as the 1970s, how it attempted to cast doubt on the science, and how it influenced public perception and policy. It spans a half-century and draws on interviews with world leaders, oil industry scientists, whistleblowers, lobbyists, and executives, as well as newly discovered internal documents.

== Backstory ==
The producers of the series were looking at answering a simple question – how did we get here? According to Frontline senior producer Dan Edge, they were looking at what choices were made, what opportunities were lost, and what cautions were simply disregarded. What, when, and how much did the fossil fuel industry know about climate change and what was done with what they knew. The series investigates how and why, particularly in the United States, that fundamental reality was successfully and dramatically obscured by organizations deliberately spreading misinformation about climate change.

== Synopsis ==
=== Part 1: Denial ===
Part 1: Denial, reveals how studies on climate change were conducted by the fossil fuel industry in the 1970s, how it denied the science, and the role it played in delaying and preventing action on climate change over the past four decades. It also examines how an industry coalition (i.e. the Global Climate Coalition) and, ultimately, politicians were able to deflate any hopes that the U.S. would ever sign on to the Kyoto Protocol.

=== Part 2: Doubt ===
Part 2: Doubt, investigates the industry's attempts to obstruct climate policy by casting doubt on the science and by forming political advocacy groups (e.g. the Americans for Prosperity) to block the Waxman-Markey bill, despite mounting evidence of climate change in the new millennium.

=== Part 3: Delay ===
Part 3: Delay, looks at the strategies used by the fossil fuel industry, including advancing natural gas as a cleaner energy source, in the hopes of slowing down the transition to renewable energy sources.

== Cast ==
Frontline conducted over 100 interviews of scientists, corporate executives, directors, employees of public relation firms, and former senators and congressmen of the United States.

- Al Gore, former Vice President and U.S. Senator
- Chuck Hagel, former U.S. Senator
- James Hansen, former Director – NASA Goddard Institute
- Bob Inglis, former U.S. Congressman
- Timothy Wirth, former U.S. Senator
- Christine Todd Whitman, former EPA Administrator and New Jersey Governor
- Heather Zichal, former environmental policy director – Obama campaign
- Ernest Moniz, former U.S. Secretary of Energy
- Ro Khanna, U.S. Congressman
- Russell Gold, former Wall Street Journal investigative reporter
- Christopher Leonard, investigative journalist
- Michael MacCracken, former U.S. Global Change Research Program and Lawrence Livermore National Laboratory researcher
- Benjamin D. Santer, climatologist, former Lawrence Livermore National Laboratory researcher
- Carl Pope, former Sierra Club executive director
- Jerry Taylor, Niskanen Center co-founder and former Cato Institute senior fellow
- Denise Bode, former American Clean Skies Foundation CEO
- Patrick Michaels, climatologist, former Cato Institute senior fellow and University of Virginia research professor
- Steve Lonegan, former Bogota, New Jersey mayor and Americans for Prosperity New Jersey chapter director
- Charif Souki, Tellurian Inc executive chairman and former Cheniere Energy CEO

== Release ==
The Power of Big Oil was first released on the PBS television network in the United States. The episodes were broadcast on the investigative program Frontline for three consecutive weeks. Part 1: Denial, an 85-minute episode was aired April 19, 2022. Part 2: Doubt, and Part 3: Delay are each 54-minute episodes.

On July 21, 2022, PBS Distribution released the series on DVD, and the Mongoose Pictures and Frontline production was broadcast on the BBC Two television channel and added to the BBC iPlayer streaming service in the United Kingdom.

== Reception ==
=== Critical response ===
The Power of Big Oil was generally well received. Mike Hale, television critic for The New York Times writes, "One lesson the show offers, almost in passing, is the way in which the refusal to accept the reality of climate change prefigured the wider attacks on science." He concludes with, “The Power of Big Oil” offers no comfort; it ends, in a rush, with the environmental rollbacks enacted by President Donald Trump and the energy crunch the Biden administration now faces because of Russia's war in Ukraine." In the Progressive Magazine, Ed Rampell stated, "This powerful documentary is essential viewing for anyone concerned with the climate crisis—and how efforts to take appropriate action were corrupted by behind-the-scenes big money interests." Chris McGreal, writer for The Guardian reported that the series "charts corporate manipulation of science, public opinion and politicians that mirrors conduct by other industries, from big tobacco to the pharmaceutical companies responsible for America’s opioid epidemic."

=== Accolades ===
The production created for the BBC earned the Albert Sustainable Production Certification for film & TV in the United Kingdom. The production was also awarded a Peabody Award in 2022.

== See also ==
- Big Oil – Largest publicly traded companies
- Climate change – Human-caused changes to climate on Earth
- Fossil fuel – Fuel formed naturally from dead plants and animals
