= Michael Peter Skelly =

American businessman (born 1961)

Michael Skelly

Personal details
- Born: October 19, 1961 (age 64)
- Education: University of Notre Dame, Harvard Business School
- Occupation: Transmission infrastructure and renewable energy entrepreneur
- Profession: 2009–2019; President and co-founder, Clean Line Energy Partners; 2021–present CEO and co-founder, Grid United

Michael Peter Skelly (born October 19, 1961) is a transmission infrastructure and renewable energy developer and entrepreneur based in Houston, Texas. He is currently the CEO of Grid United, an independent interregional transmission development company he co-founded in 2021.

From 1999 to 2008, he served as the Chief Development Officer for Horizon Wind Energy, which by 2007 had become the second-largest wind farm developer and third-largest wind farm owner in the United States.

In 2009, Skelly co-founded and served as president of Clean Line Energy, an independent developer of long-distance, high voltage direct current transmission lines, until 2018. Skelly's work at Clean Line is detailed in the book, "Superpower: One Man's Quest to Transform American Energy" by Wall Street Journal Energy reporter and Pulitzer Prize finalist Russell Gold.

== Family and Personal Life ==
=== Early life and education ===
Michael Skelly was born in England in 1961 to Irish parents. At the age of two, Skelly sailed with his family aboard the SS America from Ireland to the United States, where they settled in Roanoke, Virginia. He went on to earn his undergraduate degree from the University of Notre Dame.

After college, Skelly joined the Peace Corps and served in Costa Rica, where he helped local fishermen develop a microcredit market to increase their economic viability after the Latin American economic crisis of the 1980s. Following the Peace Corps, Skelly enrolled in Harvard Business School, where he earned his M.B.A.

=== Adult life ===
Skelly married Anne Whitlock in 1991. The couple has three grown children: two boys and a girl. In 2013 Skelly and Whitlock purchased the hundred year old Houston Firehouse No. 2, which had fallen into disrepair since its decommissioning in the 1980s. The couple renovated the firehouse, turning the downstairs into a community and events space and the upstairs into their residence. Skelly and Whitlock were named as one of Houston's 29 most powerful couples by the Houston Chronicle in 2021.

== Business career ==
=== Aerial tram ===
In 1992, Skelly and his partners began the development of an aerial tram adjacent to the Braulio Carrillo National Park of Costa Rica to promote ecotourism. Skelly navigated logistical, financial, and bureaucratic challenges, completing the project in 1994. The open-air tram – purchased from a U.S. ski resort – is a mile long and rises to the rainforest canopy to immerse guests in an up-close view of the biodiverse ecosystem. The tram is still operational today.

=== Energia Global ===
Skelly joined Energia Global in 1996, developing small energy projects in Central America. Skelly led Energia Global's efforts for Tierras Morenas, a proposed wind farm. Energia Global needed a financial partner to invest capital for purchasing the wind farm site. To do so, Skelly forged a partnership with Michael Zilkha, Texan investor and co-owner of International Wind. They purchased the land and developed the project; by 1999, the project was completed and contributing electricity to the Costa Rican grid. It became the largest wind farm in Costa Rica, and at the time was one of the largest in Latin America. In 2001, Tierras Morenas and two other smaller wind farms generated 4% of Costa Rica's power.

=== Horizon Wind Energy ===
In 1999, after his time at Energia Global in Costa Rica, Skelly moved to Houston to work as Chief Development Officer for International Wind, the company that had partnered with Energia Global on the Tierras Morenas wind farm. Michael Zilkha and his father, Selim Zilkha, owned 50% of International Wind until 2000, when they bought out the other 50% interest and renamed the company Zilkha Renewable Energy under their full ownership. Zilkha Renewable developed wind farms across the United States, including the 75 megawatt (MW) Blue Canyon Wind Farm in Oklahoma and 320 MW Maple Ridge Wind Farm in New York.

In 2005, Goldman Sachs purchased Zilkha Renewable and the company was rebranded Horizon Wind Energy. At the time of acquisition, Zilkha Renewables had 4,000 MW of wind-energy projects under development in 12 states.

Goldman Sachs sold Horizon in 2007 to EDP Renewables for $2.2 billion for a reported gain of nearly $1 billion. By then Horizon had grown to the third largest wind company in the United States.

=== Clean Line Energy ===
In 2009, Skelly founded Clean Line Energy Partners. Clean Line was an independent developer of long-distance, high-voltage direct-current (HVDC) transmission lines, aiming to provide transmission solutions to connect renewable energy resources in North America to communities and cities that lacked access to new, low-cost renewable power. His work at Clean Line Energy Partners and Horizon Wind Energy is described in detail in the book Superpower by Russell Gold.

The company had four proposed projects: Plains & Eastern Clean Line, Grain Belt Express Clean Line, Western Spirit Clean Line, and Mesa Canyons Wind Farm. The Plains and Eastern Clean Line came the closest to being developed. Plains & Eastern was to deliver up to 4,000 MW from Oklahoma Panhandle wind farms to a Tennessee Valley Authority (TVA) substation outside of Memphis, to then offload power onto the TVA grid and for sale to southeastern utilities.

Clean Line faced numerous bureaucratic challenges while attempting to develop its HVDC transmission lines. After ten years of development work, Skelly sold the Clean Line projects to other energy developers in 2018.

=== Grid United ===
In 2021, Skelly co-founded Grid United with Houston-based philanthropist John D. Arnold. Skelly serves as CEO. Grid United is an independent transmission company developing high-voltage direct-current (HVDC) transmission lines. The goals of the company are to tie regional grids together to improve grid resiliency and efficiency nationwide, deliver long-term economic benefits to communities, and provide electricity customers with access to low-cost resources.

=== Professional Recognitions and Advisory Positions ===
In 2008, the American Wind Energy Association named Skelly "Wind Energy Person of the Year" at the WindPower 2008 Conference.

In October 2021, Skelly was appointed to a two-year term on the United States Department of Energy (DOE) Secretary of Energy Advisory Board (SEAB) by former U.S. Secretary of Energy Jennifer Granholm. The SEAB "provides advice and recommendations to the Secretary of Energy on the Administration's energy policies, the Department's basic and applied research and development activities, economic and national security policy, and on any other activities and operations of the Department of Energy, as the Secretary may direct."

== 2008 Congressional Campaign ==
In November 2008, Skelly ran as the Democratic candidate for Texas's 7th congressional district in the U.S. House of Representatives against three-term Republican incumbent John Culberson. Skelly's campaign received national attention for its fundraising efforts. Ultimately, Skelly lost the election to Culberson by 42% to 56%.

== Community leadership ==
Skelly served on the board or in leadership positions across various community organizations or efforts, including LINK Houston, Houston Bike Share, Greentown Labs, Houston Parks Board, the Make I-45 Better Coalition, and Living Bank.

== Published Articles ==
The Houston Chronicle has published a number of opinion pieces by Skelly on energy, urban issues, and infrastructure, including:

- Commentary: With right policies, renewables, natural gas can build energy security while addressing climate (2022)
- Houston needs new public spaces fast to save restaurants and slow COVID-19 (2020)
- Stop planning city for cars along transit: New recommendations will undermine walkable future (2020)
- Houston's building codes limit city's growth (2018)
- Why is flood-prediction technology MIA? (2016)
- New ideas can help us move (2015)
- Switch to 10-foot traffic lanes can save Houston lives (2014)
- More transit choices critical if city to remain low-cost place to live (2014)
