= Wind power in Oklahoma =

Electricity from wind in one U.S. state

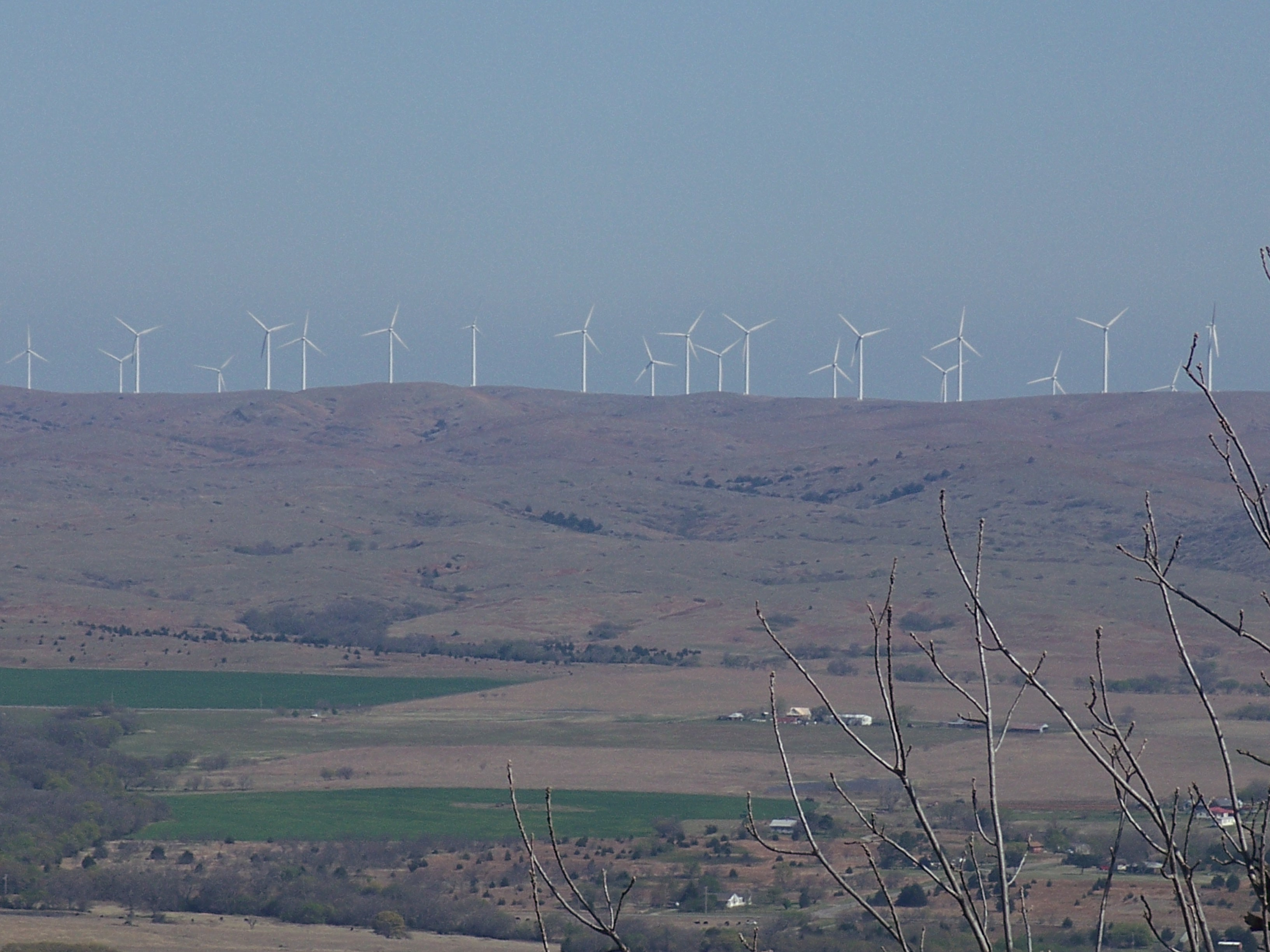
The Blue Canyon Wind Farm

The U.S. state of Oklahoma has high potential capacity for wind power in its western half. In 2021, Oklahoma's installed wind generation capacity was almost 10,500 megawatts, supplying over 40% of the state's generated electricity and 85% of its total generating capacity from all renewable resources.

== Growth ==
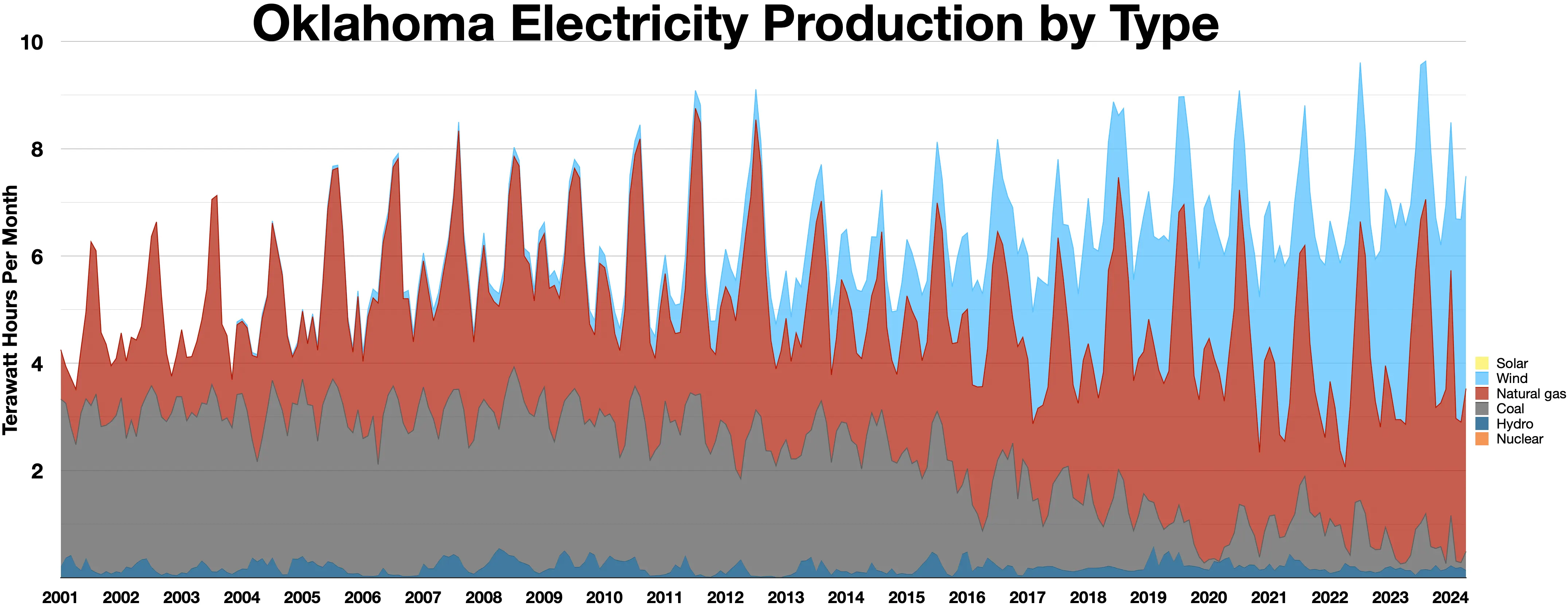
Oklahoma electricity production by type

Oklahoma wind generation by year
Million kilowatt-hours of electricity

Oklahoma wind capacity by year
Megawatts of generation capacity

Wind farms in Oklahoma include:

- Blue Canyon Wind Farm, 324 MW
- Centennial Wind Farm, 120 MW
- Red Hills Wind Farm, 123 MW
- The Weatherford Wind Energy Center, 147 MW

The $3.5 billion, 800 mile, Plains & Eastern Clean Line transmission line was approved in 2012, which was expected to be completed by 2017, and would have the capacity to deliver 7,000 MW of wind power. As of April 2017, Clean Line Energy Partners did not have any binding contracts to provide electricity to an electric utility. The only tentative, nonbinding, agreement Clean Line was able to obtain was for 50 MW of capacity.

In 2010, Oklahoma adopted a goal of generating 15% of its electricity from renewable sources by 2015. Wind power accounted for 18.4% of the electricity generated in Oklahoma during 2015. At the end of 2015, Oklahoma's installed wind generation capacity was 5,184 MW. During 2017, wind power accounted for 31.9% of the electricity generated in Oklahoma. Installed capacity at the end of 2017 was 7,495 MW, the state being second in terms of installed capacity.

In 2017, Invenergy and GE announced plans for the $4.5 billion, 2,000 MW Wind Catcher (aka Windcatcher) project on a 300,000-acre site in Cimarron and Texas counties in the Oklahoma Panhandle, which would have been among the world's largest wind farms when completed in 2020. American Electric Power (AEP) utility subsidiaries Public Service Company of Oklahoma (PO) and Southwestern Electric Power Co. (SWEPCO) asked utility regulators in Louisiana, Arkansas, Texas and Oklahoma to approve plans to purchase the wind farm from Invenergy upon completion of construction. However, the project ran into opposition and was cancelled in July 2018.

PSO was approved in early 2020 by regulators in Oklahoma as well as Arkansas to own a 45.5% share of a massive 1,485 megawatt wind project known as the North Central Energy Facilities, with SWEPCO owning the rest. The project includes three wind farms covering areas in Alfalfa, Blaine, Custer, Kingfisher, Garfield, Major and Woods counties of Oklahoma. Hearings still need to be held in Texas and Louisiana. While the abandoned Wind Catcher plan envisioned a new 765-kilovolt transmission line, which would have run hundreds of miles in Oklahoma, the North Central facilities are near an existing PSO/SWEPCO transmission system. The project is said to be scalable, so that states which approve the project would have the ability to increase the number of megawatts allocated to them should another state reject the proposal, as long as a minimum of 810 MW is committed.

The Traverse Wind Energy Center, located north of Weatherford came online in 2022, with a capacity of 999 MW. It was built by Invenergy and contracted by American Electric Power. It is the second-largest wind project in the United States, behind the Alta Wind Energy Center in California.

== Potential ==
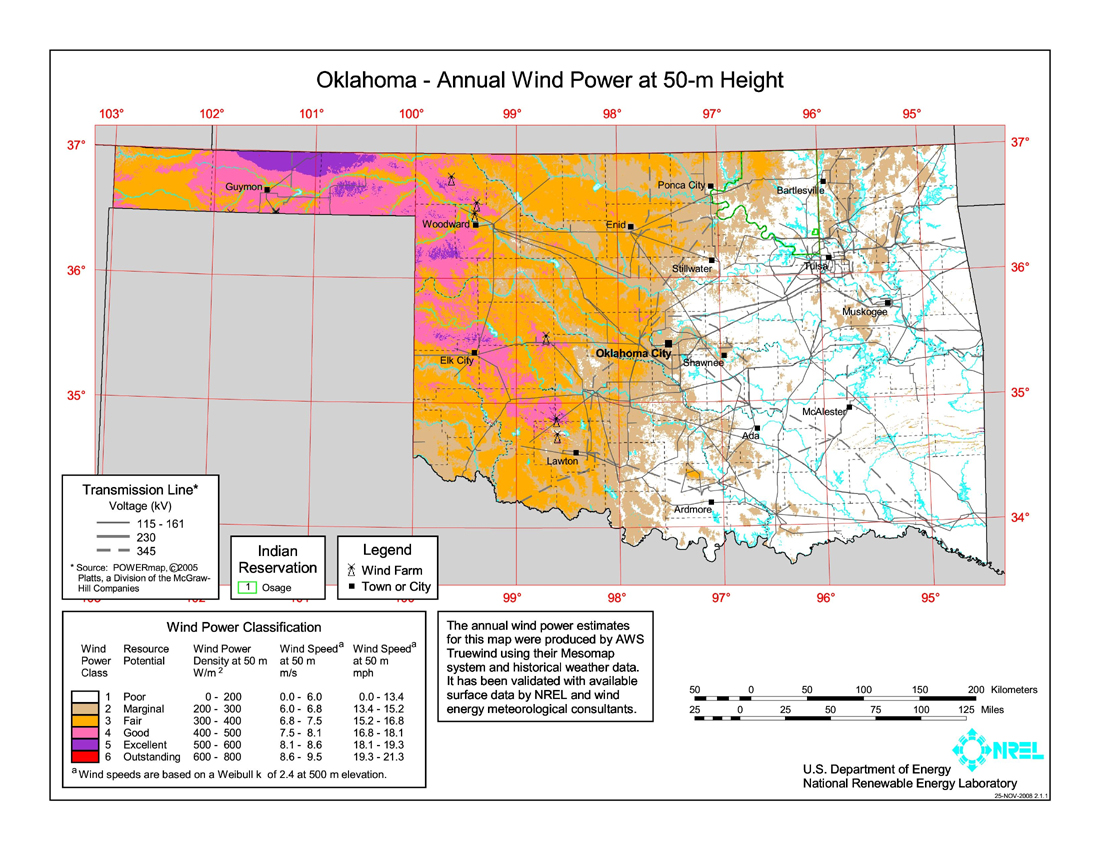
Oklahoma wind resources are concentrated in the panhandle.

Being centrally located, the western half of Oklahoma is in America's wind corridor, which stretches from Canada into North Dakota and Montana, south into west Texas, where the vast majority of the country's best on-shore wind resources are located. Oklahoma has the potential to install 517,000 MW of wind turbines, capable of generating 1,521,652 GWh each year. This is over one third of all the electricity generated in the United States in 2011.

== Economic benefits ==
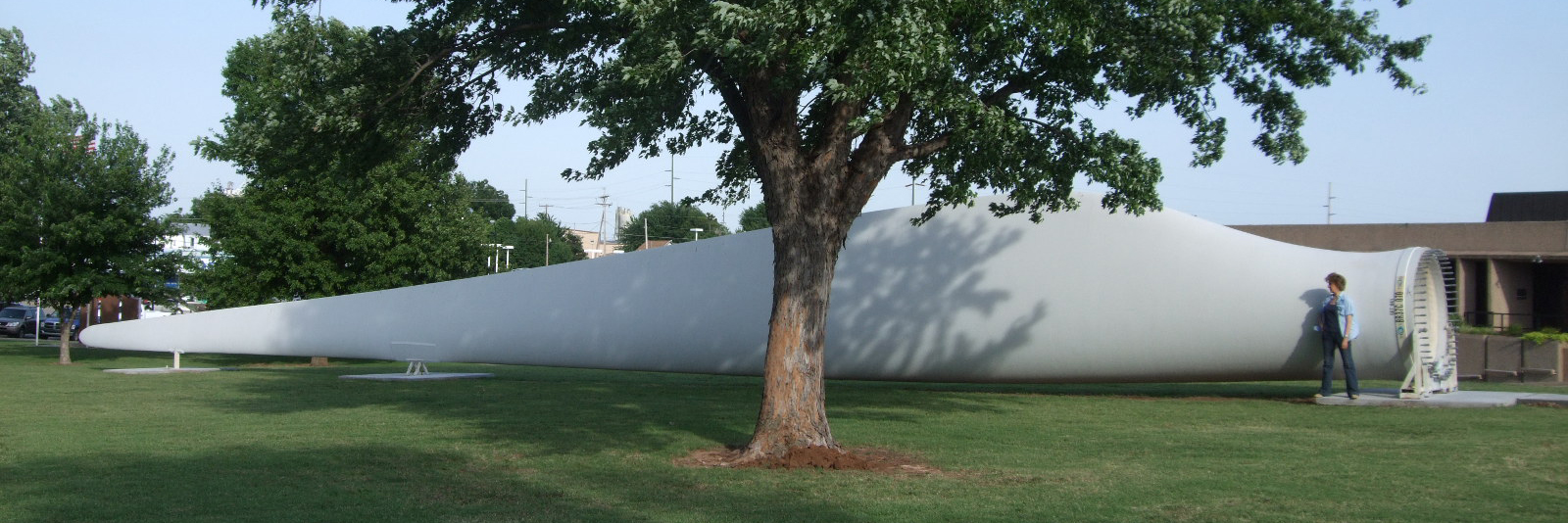
Wind turbine blade on display in Weatherford

In 2014, Oklahoma's wind resources were considered the eighth best in the United States. The total number of direct and indirect jobs in the state from wind power development was estimated to be between 1,000 and 2,000.

Oklahoma ended the half-cent tax credit for wind by July 2017. All zero-emission rebates were $60 million in the 2014 tax year.

== Wind generation ==
Oklahoma wind generation in 2016

Oklahoma wind generation (GWh, million kWh)
Year	Total	Jan	Feb	Mar	Apr	May	Jun	Jul	Aug	Sept	Oct	Nov	Dec
2003	54												54
2004	574	45	46	54	49	77	38	39	38	48	41	41	58
2005	847	35	36	54	98	78	92	69	52	76	74	80	103
2006	1,712	171	130	164	175	141	123	125	95	109	153	165	161
2007	1,849	146	165	199	184	147	108	84	162	150	209	159	136
2008	2,359	227	175	220	237	228	197	171	101	143	204	209	247
2009	2,697	209	209	272	272	184	204	163	202	152	253	269	308
2010	3,807	232	187	398	407	302	365	262	261	311	299	408	375
2011	5,606	348	449	529	534	567	561	333	336	343	498	626	482
2012	8,159	701	536	757	632	729	679	568	453	518	799	832	955
2013	11,252	886	828	1,109	1,127	1,069	1,007	772	681	769	1,125	1,044	835
2014	11,937	1,176	745	1,182	1,251	957	1,097	782	781	875	901	1,188	1,002
2015	14,031	1,053	1,080	936	1,227	1,136	1,110	1,136	955	1,311	1,060	1,587	1,442
2016	20,069	1,423	1,763	1,990	1,728	1,701	1,380	1,725	1,234	1,506	2,062	1,719	1,838
2017	23,599	1,943	2,080	2,445	2,300	1,898	1,949	1,463	978	1,843	2,562	2,037	2,101
2018	27,338	2,711	2,262	2,745	2,816	2,391	2,743	1,150	2,080	1,868	1,884	2,151	2,537
2019	29,007	2,384	2,009	2,431	2,757	2,420	2,005	2,149	2,013	2,633	3,134	2,446	2,626
2020	29,417	2,661	2,576	2,521	2,732	2,171	3,106	1,855	1,897	1,844	2,466	2,897	2,691
2021	32,540	2,729	1,874	3,520	3,269	2,738	2,197	1,759	2,610	2,818	2,889	2,918	3,219
2022	37,553	2,994	3,099	3,494	4,162	3,673	3,133	2,965	2,291	2,493	2,654	3,295	3,299
2023	37,012	3,435	3,556	3,974	3,601	2,322	2,063	2,853	2,525	2,814	3,568	2,873	3,429
2024	37,967	2,670	3,660	3,645	3,807	2,908	3,374	3,020	2,949	2,278	3,320	3,134	3,202
2025	38,031	3,128	3,108	3,936	3,514	2,675	3,120	3,234	2,598	2,368	3,161	3,183	4,005
2026	23,724	3,925	3,397	4,577	4,350	3,474	4,001						

In 2017, Oklahoma's installed wind generation capacity was almost 7,500 megawatts, supplying almost a third of the state's generated electricity.

In 2019, 53.5% of the power production in Oklahoma was produced from natural gas and 34.6% from wind power.

== See also ==
- Solar power in Oklahoma
- Wind power in the United States
- Renewable energy in the United States
