= American Clean Skies Foundation =

Environmental advocacy organization

- Type: 501(c)(3), Non-profit
- Founded: 2007
- Headquarters: Washington, D.C., USA
- Key people: Gregory C. Staple, CEO
- Products: Energy and environmental policy
- Website: cleanskies.org

American Clean Skies Foundation (ACSF) is a 501(c)(3) not-for profit organization based in Washington, D.C., United States. It advocates for a cleaner, low-carbon environment through the expanded use of alternative energy sources and energy efficiency. ACSF stopped operations in 2019 pending further funding.

== History ==
When it was formed in 2007 and during its initial years, the foundation was chaired by Aubrey McClendon, the former CEO and chairman of Chesapeake Energy, which provided funding. In February 2013, McClendon resigned from the ACSF Board of Directors and neither he nor Chesapeake Energy are currently involved with the foundation.

Denise Bode, a former Oklahoma Corporation Commissioner, was ACSF's first CEO. On 1 January 2009, Bode resigned from ACSF to become the new CEO of the American Wind Energy Association. Gregory C. Staple, a Partner in the Washington, D.C. office of Vinson & Elkins LLP, was named to replace Bode in December 2009.

== Campaigns ==
The foundation is involved in research and advocacy on federal and state clean energy policy. Its activities include:

- California renewable energy – The foundation is working with businesses, universities and environmental groups to analyze and develop policy to expand market access for renewable energy. In June 2014, the foundation's CEO published an op-ed supporting Community Choice Aggregation (CCA) and also contended that reform of outdated state rules is desirable to enable California companies to directly contract for renewable sources of electricity. The case for letting competitive renewable power providers serve large users in California was also the subject of a second op-ed in November 2014.
- Renewable Power Direct (RPD) – In 2013, the foundation provided seed-funding for RPD, a for-profit company that offers large electricity users medium-term wholesale contracts for the power generated from proven renewable energy projects. RPD provides a practical alternative for companies that are unable to install renewable energy on site or commit to long-term (15-20 year) power purchase agreements. RPD is authorized by the Federal Energy Regulatory Commission to act as a wholesale power marketer.
- The Oil Shift Campaign – The foundation's 2012 report contends that repointing federal procurement could enable federal agencies to reduce oil imports by billions of gallons annually, cut greenhouse gas emissions by over 20 million metric tons a year, and stimulate the nationwide introduction of tens of thousands of new alternative fuel vehicles. The foundation has worked to implement its report through industry workshops, op-eds, conferences and public advocacy. Supporters include American Council on Renewable Energy, Advanced Energy Economy and the Electric Drive Transportation Association. In January 2014, the Foundation claimed credit for new environmental provisions incorporated into a proposed government-wide contract announced by the General Service Administration (GSA) for an estimated $1.5 billion in overnight delivery services. Prospective vendors will be judged, in part, on their "continuous annual improvements in fleetwide fuel efficiency, alternative fuels use, greenhouse gas emissions intensity" and related factors.
- Interventions at the EPA in support of: (a) more stringent air pollution controls on fossil-fuel fired power plants; and (b) stricter tail-pipe emission standards for light and medium duty vehicles. For example, in November 2014 the foundation supported the EPA's proposed rules to reduce greenhouse gas emissions from existing coal-fired power plants. In 2011, ACSF also supported new Mercury and Air Toxic Standards (MATS) on power plants arguing, in part, that switching from coal to natural gas would facilitate industry compliance and lead to reduced greenhouse gas emissions as well. ACSF supported the new 54.5 mile per gallon corporate average fuel economy (CAFE) rules for light and medium duty vehicles. The foundation also sought to ensure that manufacturing incentives to spur the production of cleaner vehicles are fuel-neutral and cover compressed natural gas (CNG) vehicles as well as electric and fuel cell vehicles.
- Potomac River Green – In August 2011, to spur the retirement of a 1940s era coal-fired power plant along the Potomac River, the foundation issued a 70-page redevelopment plan for the 25-acre site. The plan, titled Potomac River Green, was designed to fund environmental remediation of the site and demonstrate a net growth in employment and tax revenues following de-commissioning of the existing facility. The Potomac River Green plan, which is estimated to cost $450 million, envisions a mixed use community with an energy museum at its center as well as with hundreds of residential homes, office space, a 125-room hotel, recreational amenities and space for alternative energy start-ups. The plant had been the single largest source of air pollutants in Northern Virginia. Previously owned and operated by GenOn Energy, it is now owned by GenOn's successor company, NRG Energy, which permanently closed the plant in 2012.

== Media Programs ==
In its early years, the foundation created an energy and environmental news service, branded as Clean Skies News; information was webcast twice daily and a half hour TV show was aired each Sunday on WJLA TV, the Washington, DC ABC affiliate.

In 2010, the foundation adopted a new magazine–news style format for the weekly show and changed the name to energyNOW!. The new show was distributed by Bloomberg TV to 65 million cable homes; it also aired on WJLA–TV in Washington, DC. Andrew Heyward, the former President of CBS News, served as the show's adviser and ombudsman. The final episode of energyNOW! was distributed in January 2012.

In 2012, the foundation announced a $250,000 Energy Visions Prize contest to reward innovative clean energy apps and videos.

== See also ==
- The Power of Big Oil
