= Chokecherry and Sierra Madre Wind Energy Project =

Wind farm in Carbon County, Wyoming

- Country: United States
- Location: Near Rawlins, Wyoming
- Coordinates: 41°42′N 107°12′W
- Status: Under construction
- Construction began: January 2017
- Commission date: 2029 (expected)
- Owner: Power Company of Wyoming

Power generation
- Nameplate capacity: 2,500 - 3,000 MW

The Chokecherry and Sierra Madre Wind Energy Project is a large-scale wind farm under construction near Rawlins, Wyoming. If completed as scheduled in 2029, it will likely become one of the largest wind farms in the United States and the world. Located largely on federal lands, the project is being built in conjunction with the TransWest Express transmission line to supply power to California. Originally slated for completion in 2020, the finish date was extended to 2026 in 2019 amid permitting, environmental, and construction delays and then extended further to June 2029.

== History and context ==
Power Company of Wyoming (PCW) began planning around 2005 for approximately 1,000 wind turbines on lands owned by The Overland Trail Ranch, located south of Rawlins, Wyoming, in Carbon County, a former coal-mining area. In 2007, PCW installed 10 test turbines to test and verify the wind resources in the proposed area. With this project, Wyoming is following the footsteps of Iowa, Kansas, Oklahoma, and Texas in taking advantage of its substantial wind resources. Major barriers to the development of wind power in Wyoming include an aging power grid, opposition due to aesthetics, concerns over the impact of wind turbines on airborne wildlife, and skepticism from the backbone of the state's economy, the fossil fuel industry. However, falling oil and coal prices have incentivized the state to reconsider its position with regards to renewable energy. According to economist Robert Godby at the University of Wyoming, who studied the impact of wind power in his state, the addition of 6,000 MW of wind power could generate over $2 billion in tax revenue and $10 billion in investments in ten years. He added that while it may not be enough to replace coal, its positive impact is considerable.

The Chokecherry and Sierra Madre Wind Energy Project is financially backed by Philip Anschutz, a billionaire from Denver, Colorado, who made his fortune largely in the fossil-fuel industry. In general, support for it comes not from political ideology but rather economics. Thanks to efforts by private companies and state governments looking for better ways to harness renewable energy and to combat climate change, the wind-power industry is becoming more and more financially feasible and economically competitive, enough to satisfy fiscal conservatives.

This was one of the priority infrastructure projects of the Trump administration in 2017. In January that year, it obtained approval from the U.S. Bureau of Land Management for its first phase, the construction and installation of 500 wind turbines. The Fish and Wildlife Service also gave the green light. Both agencies said that not only is the environmental impact of this phase negligible, it would be a net positive for the eagles in the area. PCW claimed that the 1,500 MW of power generated from the first phase of the project could help reduce U.S. carbon emissions by millions of tons per year.

== Project ==
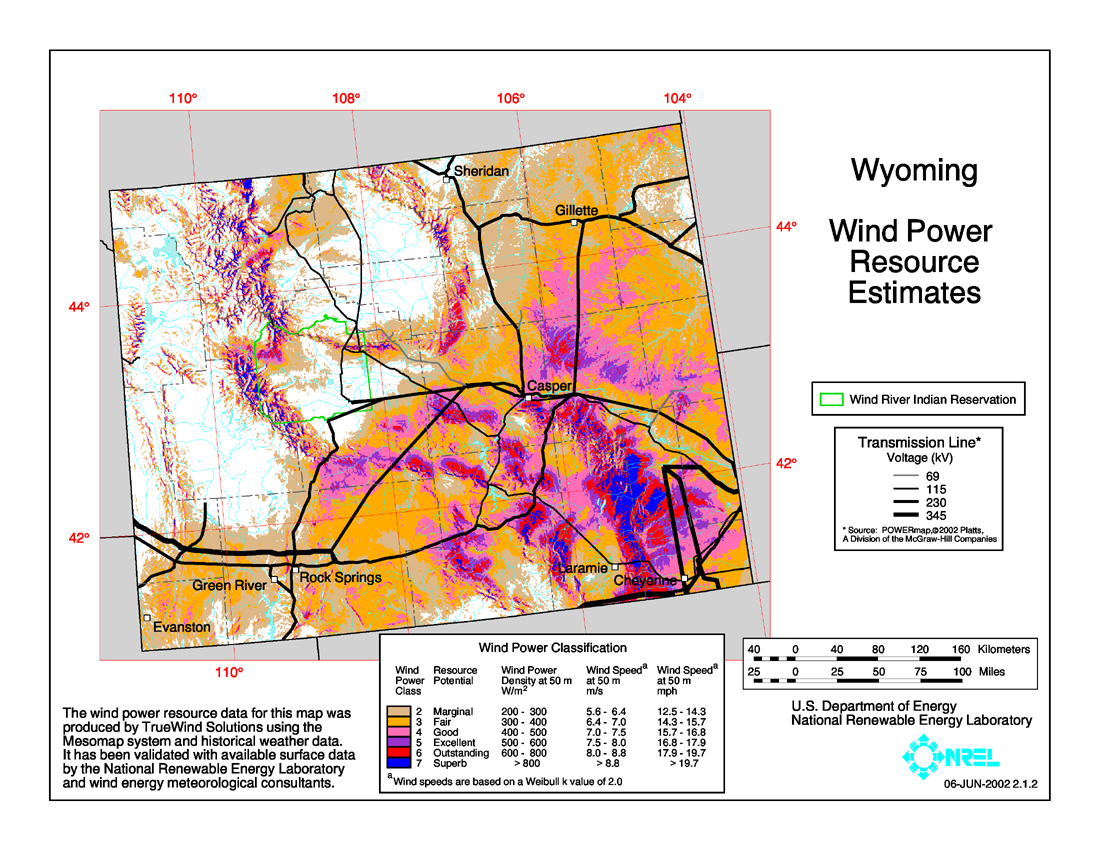
Wind resource map of Wyoming at 50 metres (160 ft) above ground. The wind farm will be located within an isolated patch of "outstanding" wind energy potential at the center-bottom of the state.

The project is proposed to generate 2,000 to 3,000 megawatts (MW) of electricity and construction may take 3–4 years with a project life estimate of 30 years. Upon completion, there will be about 1,000 wind turbines, occupying around 0.5% (1,500 out of 320,000 acres) of a ranch so large that it straddles Continental Divide.

While winds in Texas and Iowa often blow at night, wind increases during the day in Wyoming, corresponding with consumption, as peak demand is late afternoon. The wind is Class 7, and the wind capacity factor is around 46%.

The first phase of 1,500 MW is expected to yield 6 TWh per year. Erecting the turbines would be difficult in daytime winds, and PCW plans to set them up at night. The turbines are to be brought on site by a new rail spur, and then distributed by 500 miles (800 km) of new construction roads.

The wind farm's original construction schedule had phase I built between 2016 and 2019 and phase II from 2022 to 2023. As of 2019, the wind farm was scheduled to be completed by 2026. There will be a transmission line to serve California. It could help that state achieve its renewable energy targets by 2030.

== Economics ==
Impact assistance to the local communities is expected to be $53 million, with much of the money going to Carbon County. Total state tax revenue could be as high as $780 million. During construction, 400 workers would be employed on average, but peaking at 900. After construction, 114 people would be permanently employed.

The associated 3,000 MW HVDC TransWest Express Transmission Line (also owned by PCW) from the area to Las Vegas (730 miles; 1,170 km) is expected by NREL analysts save $500 million to around $1 billion per year for Californian consumers, compared to Californian alternatives. The TWE received approvals in December 2016/January 2017.

Wyoming is one of the few U.S. states to tax wind power. This was done in order to protect the coal, oil, and natural gas industry, the backbone of the state economy. As of 2017, Wyoming remained heavily dependent on its coal industry, which 40% of US coal was derived from. With public support, the state government eliminated its sales-and-use tax exemption for utility-scale renewable-energy equipment in 2009 and imposed a $1 per megawatt-hour tax on wind power in 2010. A tax increase may impact the economics of the project. In all, taxes have increased the cost of the project by about $440 million. Efforts by some state legislators to raise the tax to $3 or even $5 per megawatt-hour have all been defeated, as of 2017. Nevertheless, any further tax hikes would likely kill the project altogether.

== Regulatory process ==
PCW applied to the Bureau of Land Management (BLM) in 2008 to build the $5 billion project, which was initially approved in 2012, and a second approval came in March 2016. There are many different approvals to apply for, and the BLM struggled to build a regulatory system capable of handling the many new large solar and wind projects on federal lands. In April 2016, the United States Fish and Wildlife Service released a draft environmental impact statement on the project for 60 days of public comment. BLM and FWS provided partial approvals in January 2017.

== Environment ==
The area is sensitive for sage-grouse. Up to 50 biologists have tagged 370 grouse since 2010, researching their behavior around the area. A team researches golden eagles, as an eagle take permit is necessary. The research is to be continued during construction and operation of the wind farm so as to be compared with the condition prior to construction. The $3 million research project is paid by PCW. The Bureau of Land Management estimated 40–64 eagles per year for 1,000 turbines, whereas the Fish and Wildlife Service estimates 10–16 for 500 turbines.

== See also ==
- List of largest power stations in the United States
- Renewable energy in the United States
- Renewable energy policy of the Donald Trump administration
