= Tellurian Inc. =

American natural gas company based in Texas

Tellurian, Inc.
- Company type: Public
- Traded as: AMEX: TELL
- Industry: Energy; Natural Gas
- Founded: February 2016; 10 years ago in Houston, Texas, US
- Founders: Charif Souki; Martin Houston
- Fate: Acquired by Woodside Energy
- Headquarters: Houston, Texas, US
- Key people: Martin Houston (chairman); Daniel Belhumeur (president)
- Revenue: $28.77 million (2019)
- Number of employees: 172 (2018)
- Website: tellurianinc.com

Tellurian Inc. is an American natural gas company headquartered in Houston, Texas. It was founded in 2016 by Charif Souki and Martin Houston. The company was acquired by Woodside Energy in 2024.

== History ==
After Charif Souki, the founder and former CEO of large natural gas company Cheniere Energy, was fired from the company after a takeover by billionaire investor Carl Icahn, he founded Tellurian in 2016 with Martin Houston, the former COO of BG Group. The board of Cheniere had expelled Souki over, in part, his plans to more ambitiously expand the company, plans that he brought to Tellurian, telling the Financial Times upon launch that he aimed to undercut its rivals, including Cheniere, by 15 to 20 percent. The company hired several former Cheniere executives, including Meg Gentle, Cheniere's former executive vice president of marketing.

On August 2, 2016, Tellurian entered into a merger agreement with petroleum company Magellan; other early investors included the French oil and gas company Total, which purchased a 23 percent stake in the company for $207 million in December 2016. After one year in operation, Tellurian went public (NASDAQ: TELL).

In 2017, Tellurian bought $85 million in shale assets in Louisiana and, in doing so, became the first United States developer to produce its own fuel for its export terminal.

Tellurian's major planned project was a liquefied natural gas production project, Driftwood LNG, on the west bank of the Calcasieu River, south of Lake Charles, Louisiana. According to the company, Driftwood was projected to produce 27,600,000 tonnes of liquified natural gas per year for export. Total, in July 2019, agreed to buy 2.5m tonnes of liquefied natural gas from Driftwood. The plant, projected to cost $30 billion (on a FFP contract from Bechtel), was backed by Total as well as Vitol and India's Petronet.

However, Tellurian ran into trouble toward the end of the decade due to delays in Driftwood's construction, dropping fuel prices, ongoing tensions between the United States and China, and the COVID-19 pandemic, which exacerbated dropping prices and greatly affected China, South Korea and Japan, three of the world's largest importers of liquefied natural gas. The company, faced with falling shares, fired 40 percent of staff in 2020.

Tellurian's animosity with Icahn and Cheniere also resulted in a lawsuit. The suit, described by Bloomberg News as the "trial of the year," was prompted by $46 million in loans Souki made to Houston's Parallax Enterprises during his time as Cheniere CEO. Cheniere alleged in the suit that Souki used those loans to found Tellurian, and also alleged that he stole the early plans for Driftwood. Tellurian argued that the loan was void, that Driftwood was a different, larger project despite sharing land with the early plans, and that Cheniere had since breached its contract with Parallax by abruptly pulling the funds. The lawsuit, which lasted for years driven by the ongoing feud, was dismissed in 2020, the year it was set to go to court.

In July 2024, Australian petroleum exploration and production company, Woodside Energy, agreed to acquire Tellurian for a total enterprise value of $1.2 billion. The acquisition was completed that October and renamed the Driftwood LNG development project as Woodside Louisiana LNG.
