= Solar power in Oklahoma =

Overview of solar power in the U.S. state of Oklahoma

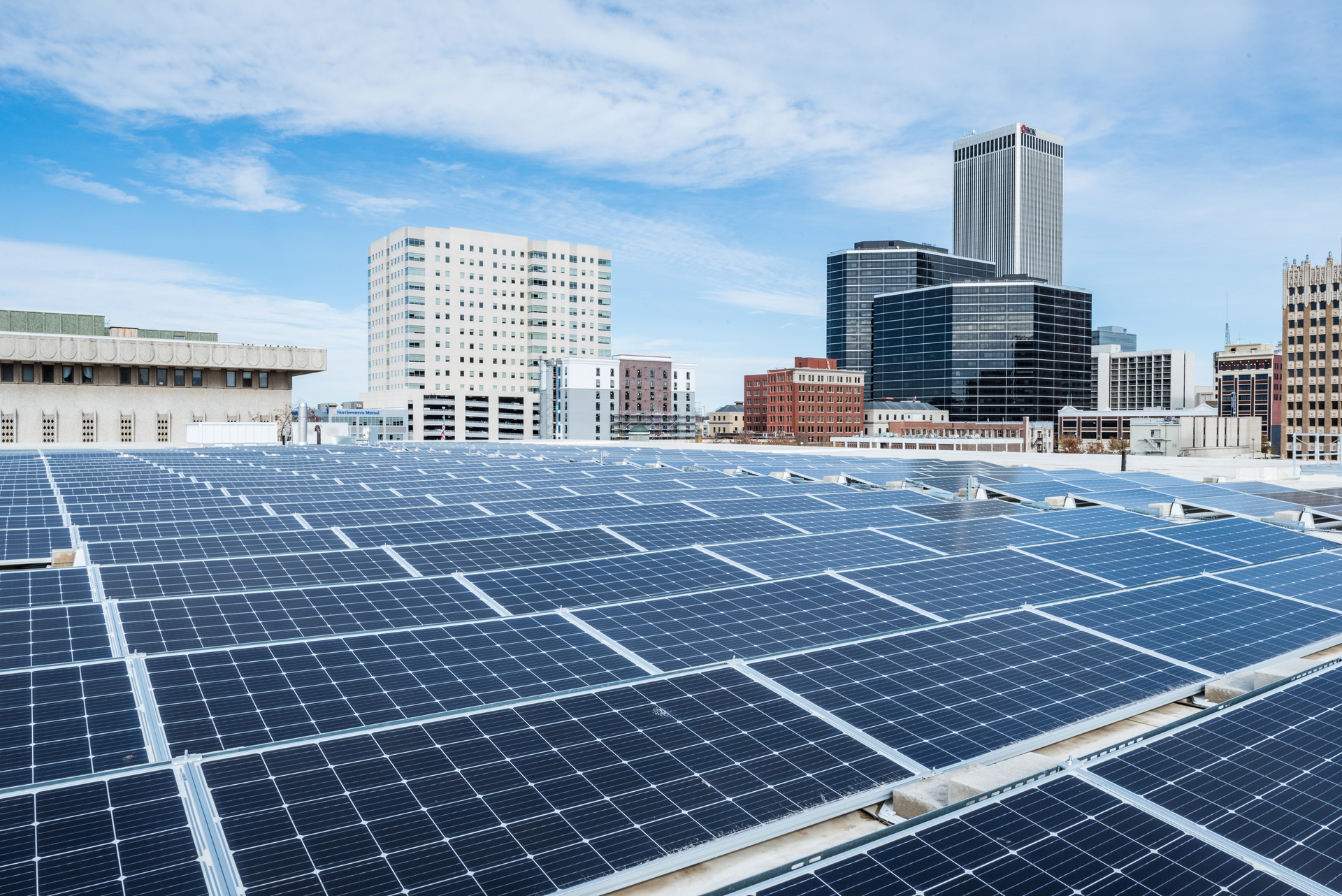
Solar panels, Tulsa Central Library

Solar power in Oklahoma can provide 44.1% of all electricity used in Oklahoma from 19,300 MW of rooftop solar panels. However, this scenario is extremely unlikely, because the cost of electricity in Oklahoma is among the lowest in the nation.

== Net metering ==
Net metering is available to all consumers generating up to 25kW installed behind a single meter. The 25kW limit is more than adequate for the typical home. Solar systems sized above this limit can create subsidies from consumers without solar installations, giving the state an F. The primary reason to use net metering is to roll over summer generation to winter usage, which requires continuous roll over of excess generation. Net metering during the month does, however, allow generation during the day when all the lights are off and everyone is away to be used at night, after the sun has gone down. Since meters are read once a month, daily net metering is not reported. As more renewable energy is used, utilities have needed to become accustomed to incorporating local distributed generation.

== Combined solar, wind, and battery storage plans ==
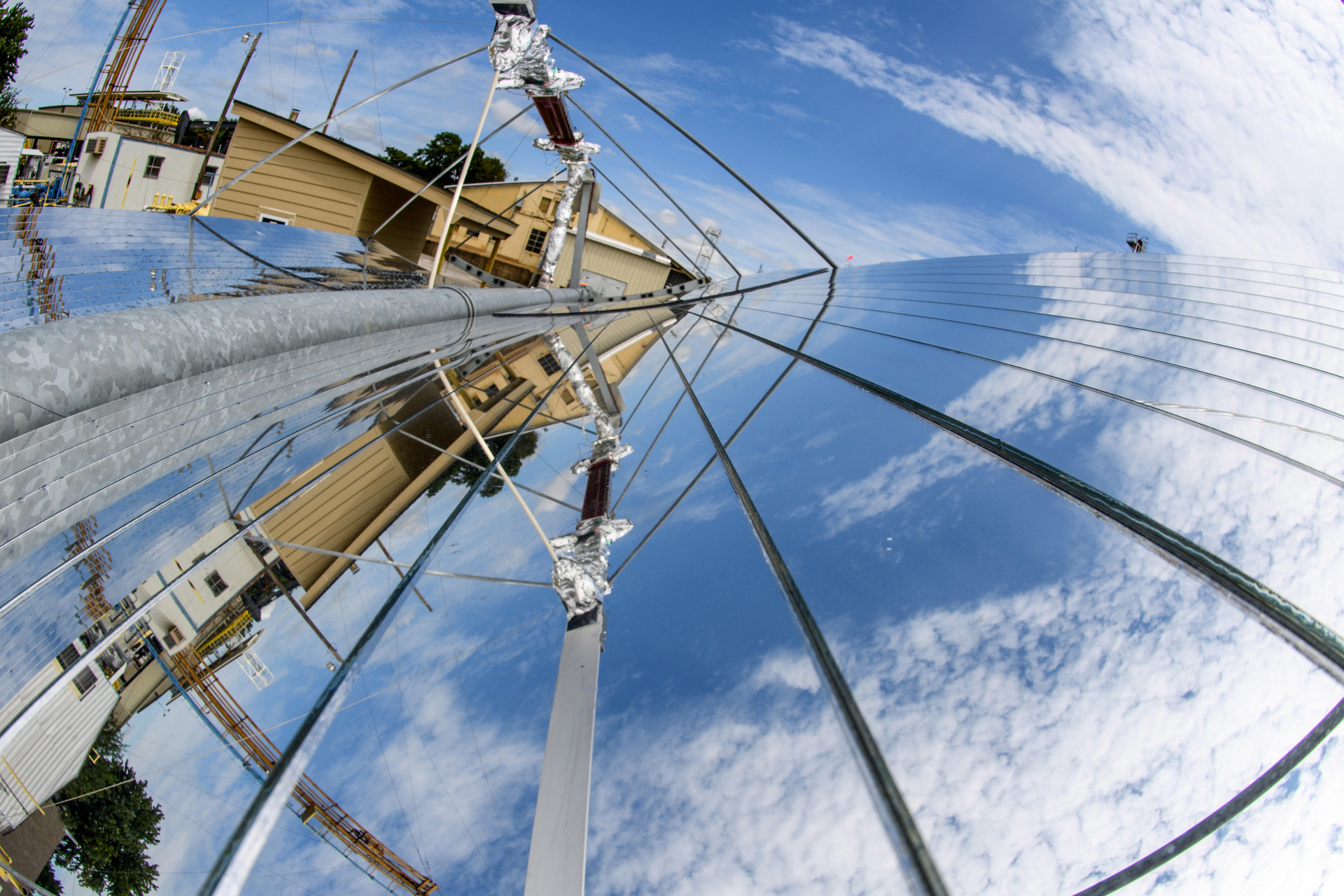
Solar panel testing, University of Tulsa

In July 2019, the Western Farmers Electric Cooperative (WFEC) announced plans for the largest combined wind, solar, and energy storage project in the US, 250 MW solar energy project, Skeleton Creek Solar, a 200 MW, 4-hour battery energy storage project, Skeleton Creek Storage, and a 250 megawatt wind farm, Skeleton Creek Wind. The solar and battery facilities are slated to come online in 2023.

== Solar challenge ==
In 2010, the American Solar Challenge, a solar car race, ran from Oklahoma to Illinois.

== Statistics ==
There are no concentrated solar power (CSP) plants planned for Oklahoma, but the state has the potential to install 1,813,000 MW of CSP, capable of generating 5,068,036 million kWh/year.

Source: NREL

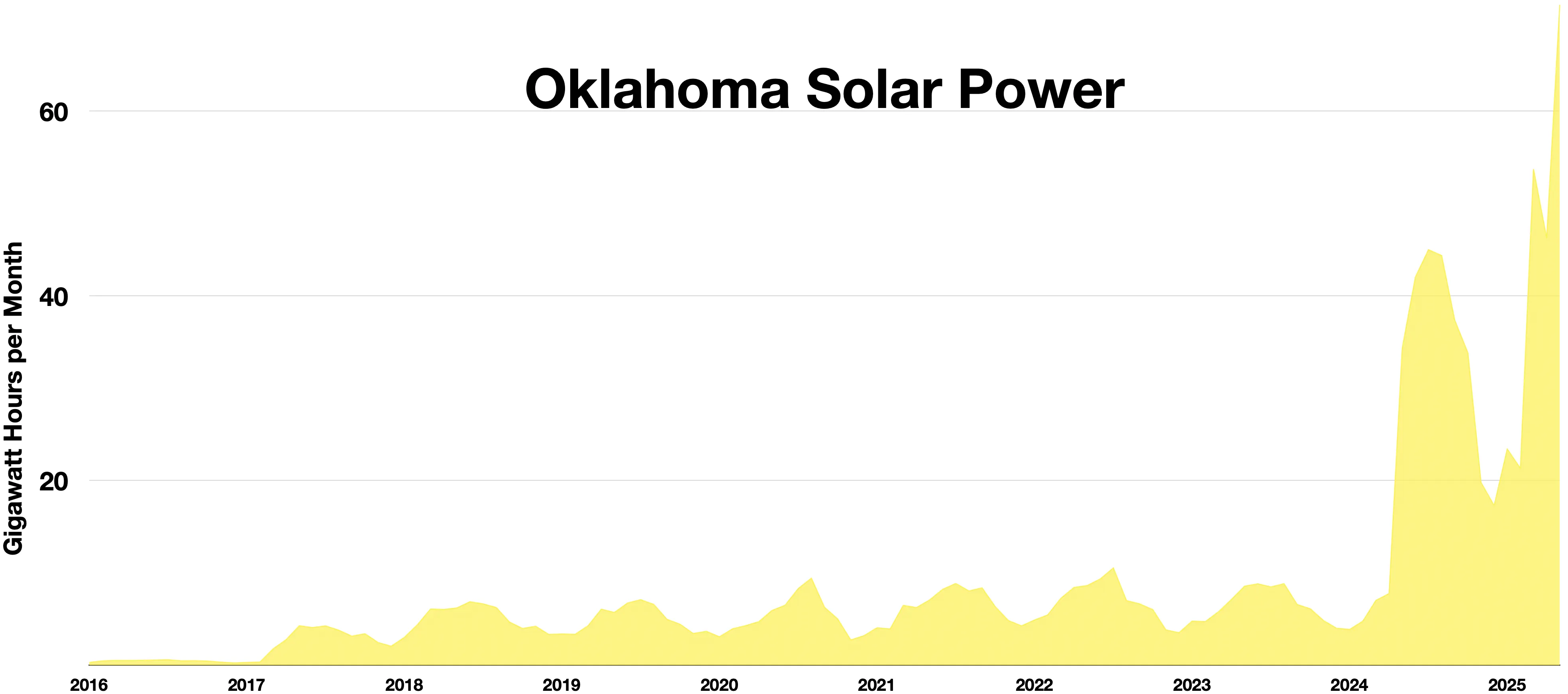
Oklahoma solar power

Grid-connected PV capacity (MW)
Year	Capacity	Installed	% change
2010	<0.1		
2011	0.2	0.1	100%
2012	0.3	0.1	50%
2013	0.7	0.4	133%
2014	1.5	0.8	114%
2015	5.2	3.7	247%
2016	7.7	2.5	48%
2017	31.7	24	311%
2018	45.7	13	44%
2019	49	3.3	7%
2020	75.3	26.3	53%
2021	89.3	14	%
2022	112	22.7	%

Utility-scale solar generation in Oklahoma (GWh)
Year	Total	Jan	Feb	Mar	Apr	May	Jun	Jul	Aug	Sep	Oct	Nov	Dec
2016	5	0	0	1	1	1	1	1	0	0	0	0	0
2017	31	0	0	2	3	4	4	4	4	3	3	2	2
2018	61	3	4	6	6	6	7	7	6	5	4	4	3
2019	59	3	3	4	6	6	7	7	7	5	4	3	4
2020	63	3	4	4	5	6	6	8	9	6	5	3	3
2021	73	4	4	6	6	7	8	8	8	8	6	5	4
2022	77	5	5	7	8	8	9	9	7	7	6	4	3
2023	5	5											

== See also ==
- Wind power in Oklahoma
- Solar power in the United States
- Renewable energy in the United States
