= Russell Gold =

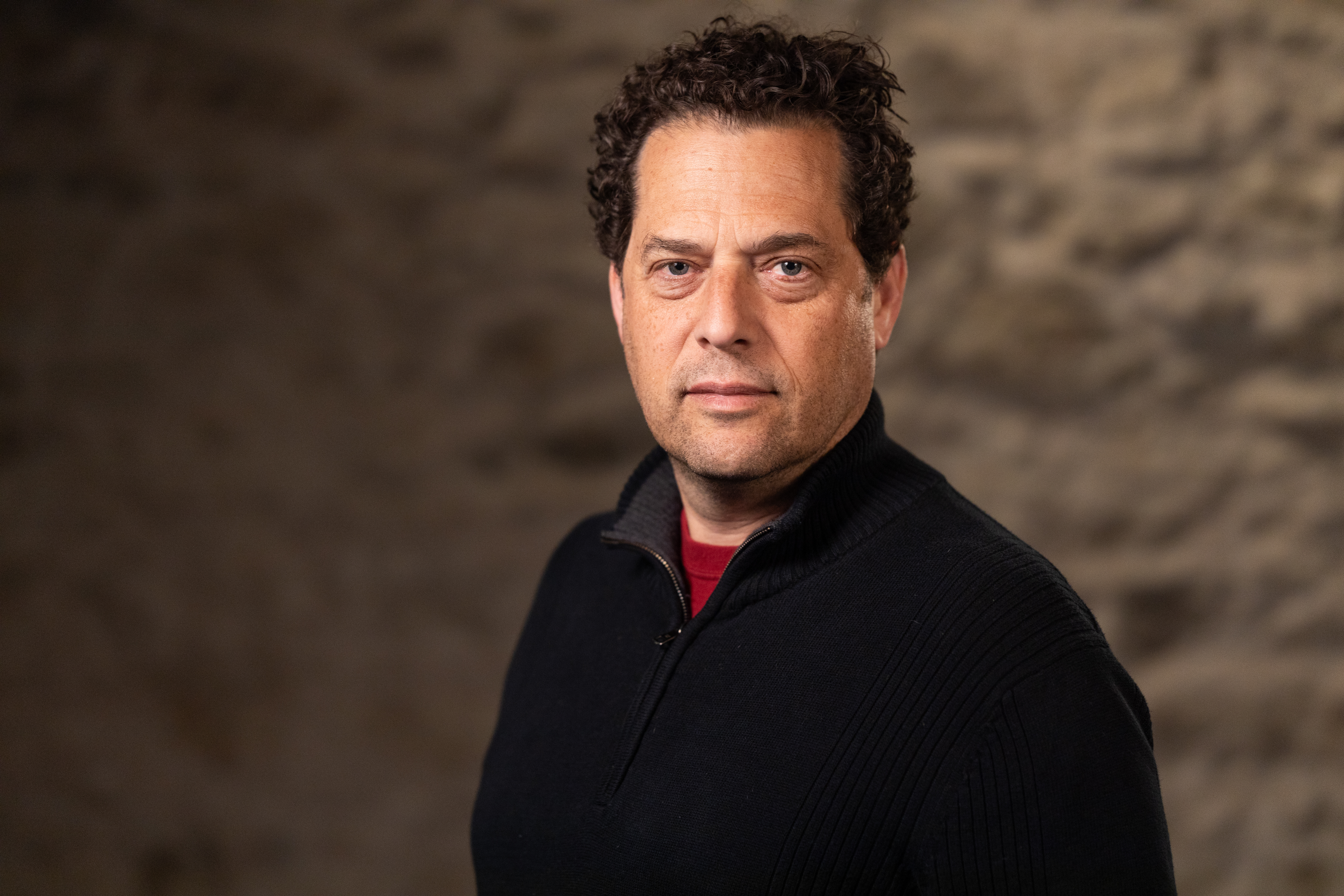
Russell Gold at the SXSW Festival in 2024.

Russell Gold (born 1971) is an author and journalist for Texas Monthly. He was previously an investigative reporter for The Wall Street Journal and the San Antonio Express-News and suburban correspondent for The Philadelphia Inquirer.

He is best known for his energy reporting on the Deepwater Horizon oil spill and the cause of the Camp Fire (2018). He is a two-time Pulitzer Prize finalist and a two-time winner of a Gerald Loeb Award for Distinguished Business and Financial Journalism for Large Newspapers.

In 2019, he was part of a Wall Street Journal team whose reporting on Pacific Gas and Electric Company and the cause of the Camp Fire (2018) was a Pulitzer Prize finalist in 2020. The reporting was also awarded the Thomas L. Stokes Award for Best Energy and Environment Writing from the National Press Foundation, and a Geral Loeb Award for Beat Reporting. He received the International Association for Energy Economics Award for Excellence in Written Journalism in 2016.

Gold graduated from Columbia University in 1993 with a degree in history. He is the author of The Boom, a book that explores the history of Fracking, and "Superpower" about renewable energy and Michael Peter Skelly.

== Bibliography ==
The Boom (Simon & Schuster, 2014): In The Boom, Russell Gold examines the issue of fracking through interviews with memorable and colorful characters: a green-minded Texas oilman who created the first modern frack; an Oklahoman natural gas empire–builder who gave the world an enormous new supply of energy but was brought down by his own success; and many others. Russell not only details the history of fracking, but also underscores how the controversial procedure is changing the way we use energy.

Superpower: One Man's Quest to Transform American Energy, (Simon & Schuster, 2019).

== Awards ==
- 2020: Thomas L. Stokes Award for Best Energy and Environment Writing from the National Press Foundation
- 2020: Gerald Loeb Award for Beat Reporting
- 2022: Peabody Award as a writer of the documentary The Power of Big Oil.
