= RPD Energy =

American energy company

- Formerly: Renewable Power Direct
- Type: Subsidiary
- Founded: 2014
- Headquarters: Washington, D.C., USA
- Key people: Eric Alam, CEO Maxim Duckworth, Chairman
- Products: Renewable Electricity
- Parent: Arcadia
- Website: RPDEnergy.com

RPD Energy, formerly Renewable Power Direct, markets directly sourced renewable electricity primarily to large commercial and industrial customers. RPD was founded in 2014 and is authorized by the Federal Energy Regulatory Commission to act as a wholesale power marketer.

RPD Energy is based in Houston, Texas, and is led by CEO, Eric Alam.

In February 2025, RPD Energy was acquired by Arcadia, a utility data and energy solutions company, for an undisclosed amount.

== About ==
RPD's publicly reported customers include Intuit Inc., Iron Mountain Incorporated, LG and REI, a leading outdoor retailer. During a March 2021 webinar, the company disclosed that it had also structured renewable energy service agreements for Adobe, the Fortune 100 software company, and McKesson, America's largest distributor of wholesale medical supplies. In January 2022, the company reported that it had also served BlackRock, the world's largest asset manager.

The company's innovative approach to sourcing green power for corporate customers has been profiled by Triple Pundit and GreenBiz.

Forbes has also profiled the company's unique green energy affinity programs for employees and customers of corporate renewable energy buyers.

In May 2020, the U.S. affiliate of Axpo, Switzerland's largest renewable energy provider, announced that it had acquired a minority interest in RPD Energy and also would be providing wholesale market services to RPD Energy “to enhance its ability to address the rapidly growing demand for renewable energy choices across multiple customer segments.” Axpo said that its new strategic partnership with RPD Energy also “allows Axpo U.S. to increase its ownership of RPD Energy over time as the business continues to grow.”

In 2021, a representative for the New York-based investment group, Arosa Capital, joined RPD's Board following a reported funding round.

RPD Energy was a founding member of the Business Renewables Center (BRC), a member-based platform that streamlines and accelerates corporate purchasing of off-site, large-scale wind and solar energy. The BRC was organized by the Rocky Mountain Institute and publicly launched in February 2015.
