= Centennial Wind Farm =

Wind power station in Oklahoma

Coordinates: 36°37′47″N 99°31′05″W

The Centennial Wind Farm is one of the largest wind farms in Oklahoma. It can produce a total of 120 megawatts of power which is enough electricity to supply about 36,000 homes. The wind farm cost $200 million and is easily visible from U.S. 183 northwest of Fort Supply.

The wind farm has an array of 80 General Electric turbines, each standing 262 feet tall at its hub, and the total height of the structure is 388 feet. The wind turbines are computer-controlled, with peak turbine performance at about 25 mph. For safety, the turbines automatically shut down if wind speeds exceed 55 mph.

The Centennial Wind Farm was built for Oklahoma Gas & Electric in Harper County by Invenergy Wind. It is one of only a few wind farms in the United States owned and operated by a utility. The electric output will be dedicated exclusively to OG&E's customers for the life of the facility.

== See also ==
- Wind farms
- Wind power
- Wind power in the United States
- Wind power in Oklahoma
