= Charif Souki =

Lebanese American businessman (born 1953)

- Born: 1953 (age 72–73); Cairo, Egypt
- Occupation: Businessman
- Known for: Development of the US LNG industry
- Parent: Samyr Souki

Charif Souki (born 1953) is an American businessman. He is the co-founder and former CEO of Cheniere Energy, an oil and gas company which specialized in liquefied natural gas. He was the highest-paid chief executive officer in the United States in 2013.

== Early life ==
Charif Souki was born in 1953 in Cairo, Egypt. His father, Samyr Souki, was a member of the Greek Orthodox Church. Souki moved to Beirut, Lebanon in 1957.

== Career ==
Souki worked as a banker on Wall Street. He also worked as a restaurateur.

Souki served as the chief executive officer of Cheniere Energy until December 2015. He earned US$142 million in 2013, making him the highest-paid CEO in the United States that year. Souki claims he stepped down as CEO after a disagreement with board member Carl Icahn.

Souki is the co-founder of Tellurian Investments with Martin Houston. Tellurian ousted its chairman and co-founder, Charif Souki, late 2023 after auditors raised doubts about the company's ability to cover future expenses.
