= Plains & Eastern Clean Line =

Proposed power line in the United States

Plains & Eastern Clean Line was a proposed 720-mile (1,160 km), 4,000 MW long-distance HVDC transmission line to bring wind power in Oklahoma to consumers in the Southeastern and Mid-Atlantic United States via the existing Tennessee Valley Authority grid. It would have termini at Guymon, Oklahoma and northeast of Memphis, Tennessee and an intermediate converter station in Pope County, Arkansas. The U.S. Department of Energy is a partner in the development, its first exercise of section 1222 of the Energy Policy Act of 2005, under which Congress authorized the department to promote electric transmission for clean energy. The project was noted for potentially bringing renewable energy to part of the country that previously had not had access.

The HVDC line to be built by a division of General Electric has been called the beginning of a North American super grid.

In late December 2017, Clean Line announced the sale of the Oklahoma portion of the Plains and Eastern to NextEra. The sale consisted of a transfer of right-of-way easements to NextEra. The Southern Alliance for Clean Energy assailed TVA for killing the project.
