= Cheniere Energy =

American liquified natural gas company

Cheniere Energy, Inc.
- Type: Public
- Traded as: NYSE: LNG; Russell 1000 Index component
- Industry: Energy, natural gas
- Founded: 1996; 30 years ago
- Headquarters: Houston, Texas
- Key people: Jack Fusco (CEO)
- Revenue: ▲US$19.5 billion (2025)
- Operating income: 4,559,000,000 United States dollar (2022)
- Net income: ▲US$5.33 billion (2025)
- Number of employees: 1,605
- Website: www.cheniere.com

Cheniere Energy, Inc. is an American liquefied natural gas (LNG) company headquartered in Houston, Texas.

In February 2016 it became the first American company to export liquefied natural gas. Cheniere Energy is the largest exporter of LNG in the United States and the second-largest LNG producer globally as of 2024.

As of 2024 it is a Fortune 500 company.

== Company history ==
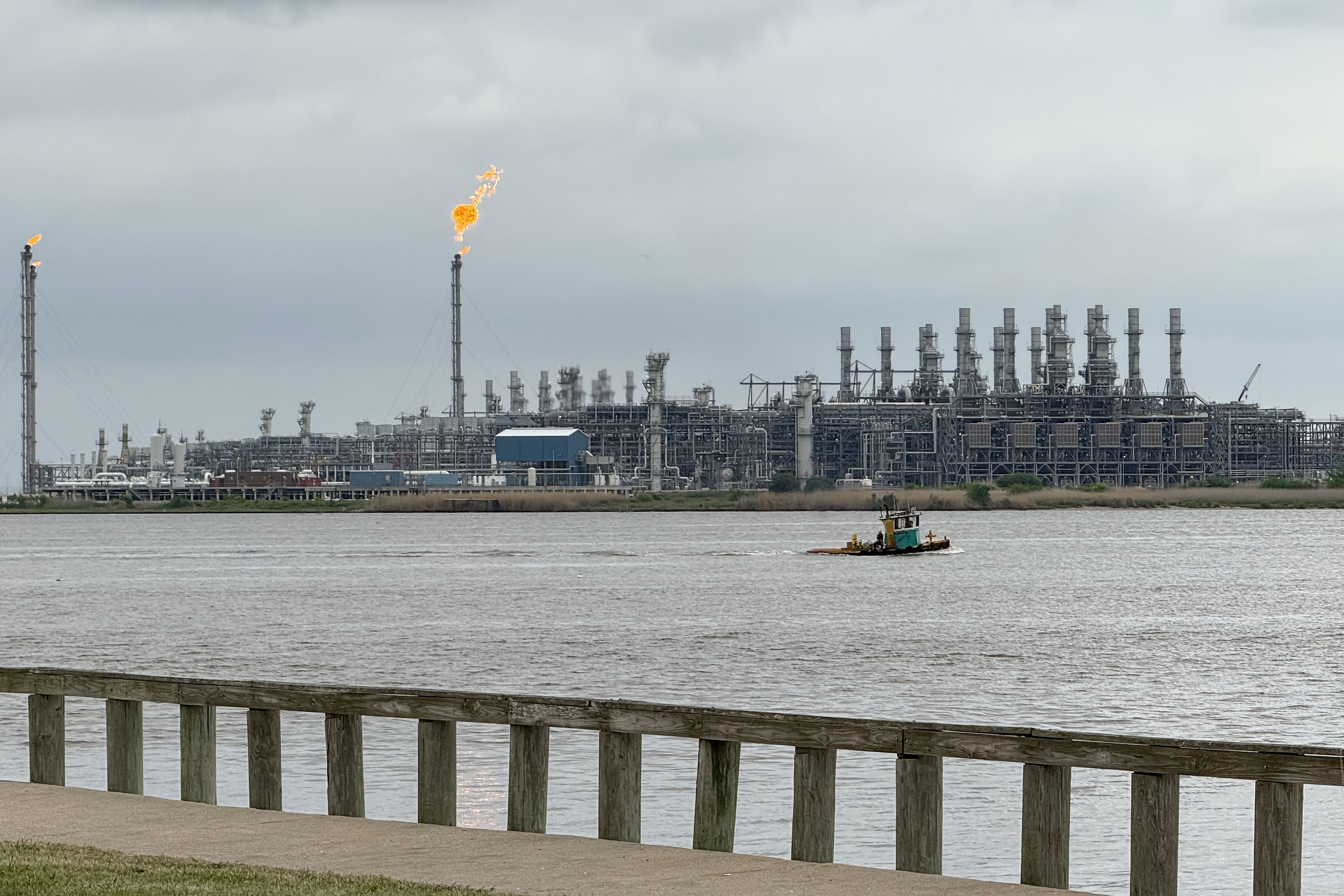
Sabine Pass LNG Terminal

Initially an oil-and-gas exploration company, the company shifted its focus in the early 2000s to developing liquified natural gas regas terminals, beginning with a terminal in Sabine Pass, Louisiana in March 2005. The company faltered in the late 2000s as LNG imports dried up due to international competition. In 2016 Cheniere founder Charif Souki was ousted after a dispute with investor Carl Icahn.

In the late 2010s, as natural gas production rose in the United States, the company grew significantly and in 2016 became an exporter of LNG to international markets.

Cheniere published its second annual corporate responsibility report in June 2021. Cheniere says it is taking innovative steps towards quantifying, monitoring, reporting and verifying data in partnership with producers and institutions in an effort to find opportunities to lower emissions.

In 2018 Cheniere Energy signed an agreement with CPC Corporation, Taiwan to supply liquefied natural gas for 25 years in a contract worth approximately US$25b. Deliveries to Taiwan are set to begin in 2021.

Cheniere and ENN Group reached a deal in 2021 which ENN would buy LNG from Cheniere. However, this deal was interrupted by the China–United States trade war before the parties came to a deal 20 year deal in 2023.

The company spends $800 million USD annually in pipeline transit fees to supply its expanding export facilities and is interested in constructing its own pipelines to access other pipelines and gas production fields.

In 2024, the CEO of Cheniere Energy, Jack Fusco, was in a meeting with Donald Trump where Trump promised to dismantle various environmental policies and climate mitigation efforts.

=== Liquefaction facilities ===
Through its subsidiaries, Cheniere Energy owns and operates two natural gas liquefaction and export facilities located in the United States: Sabine Pass LNG Terminal in Cameron Parish, Louisiana at Sabine Pass and Corpus Christi LNG Terminal near Corpus Christi, Texas.

On December 30, 2024, Cheniere Energy announced the successful production of the first liquefied natural gas from a new facility at its Corpus Christi LNG Terminal. This was an important step in the Corpus Christi Stage 3 expansion project, which commenced construction in mid-2022, led by its primary contractor, Bechtel Energy. The Corpus Christi Stage 3 expansion project is designed to increase the terminal's liquefied natural gas production capacity by an additional 10 million metric tonnes per annum. As of November 30, 2024, the overall project completion rate stood at 75.9%.
