= Red Hills Wind Farm =

Wind farm in Oklahoma, United States

Coordinates: 35°31′55″N 99°24′14″W

The 123 megawatt (MW) Red Hills Wind Farm is located in Roger Mills and Custer counties, near Elk City, Oklahoma. The wind farm has 82 Acciona 1.5-MW wind turbines, and the Red Hills facility is spread across 5,000 acres (20 km^{2}). Acciona Energy North America opened the wind farm in June 2009.

Red Hills Wind Farm created 15 new full-time local jobs and more than 200 people were employed during the construction phase. Long-term lease agreements have been completed with 12 local landowners or land trusts. With the exception of the small footprint made by the 82 turbines, at about 1-acre (0.40 ha) each, land use is dominated by cattle grazing which co-exists with the wind power production.

== See also ==
- Wind power in the United States
- List of onshore wind farms
