= Blue Canyon Wind Farm =

Wind farm in Oklahoma, USA

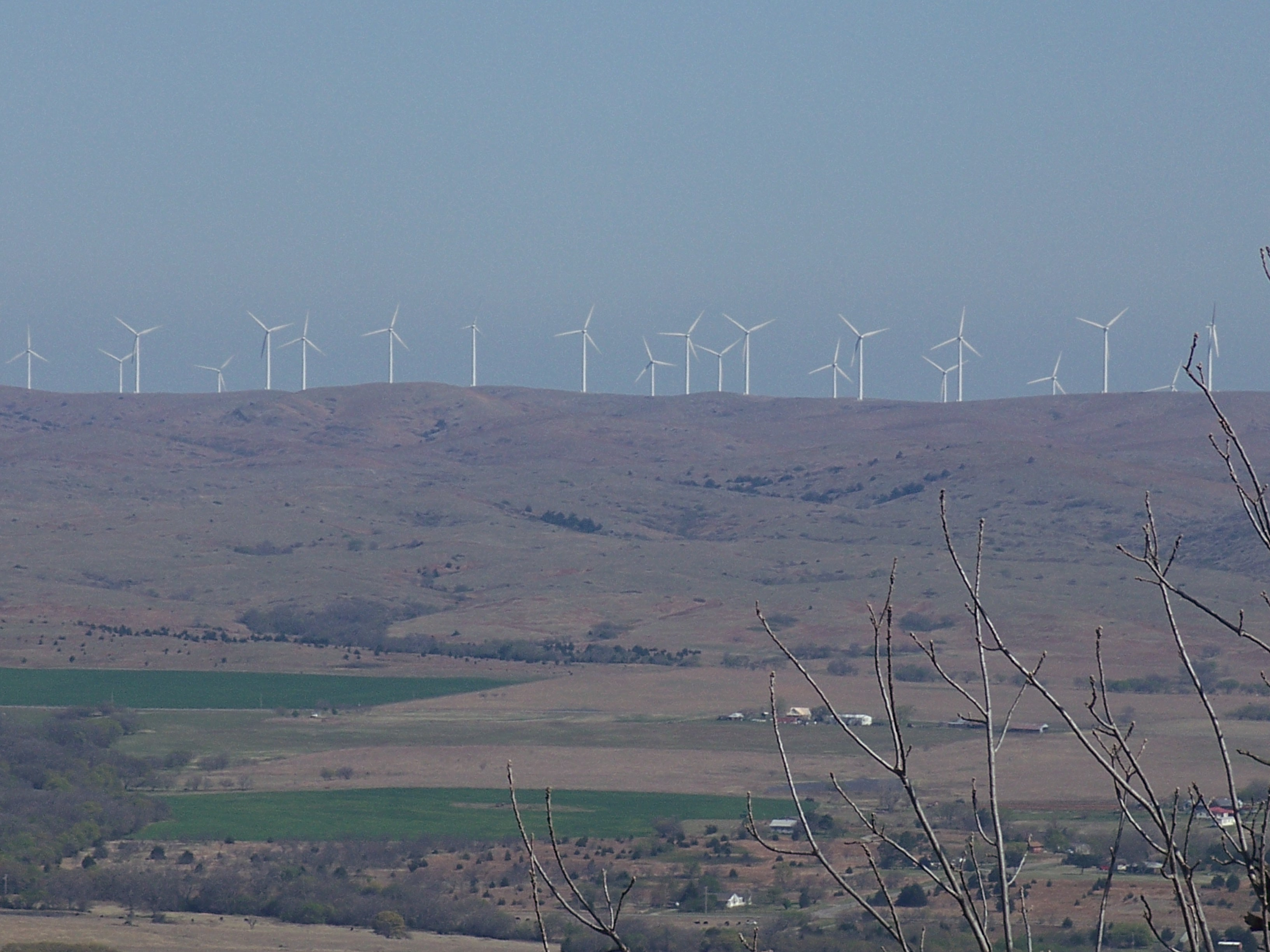
- Blue Canyon Wind Farm from Mount Scott
- Official name: Blue Canyon Wind Farm
- Country: United States
- Coordinates: 34°51′37″N 98°34′57″W
- Status: Operational
- Commission date: December 2003
- Owner: EDP Renewables North America
- Operator: EDP Renewables North America

Wind farm
- Type: Onshore

Power generation
- Units operational: 250 turbines
- Make and model: Vestas NM72-1.65 MW (BC I); Vestas V80-1.8 MW (BC II); GE sle 1.5 MW (BC V); Vestas V90-1.8 MW (BC VI)
- Nameplate capacity: 423.45 MW
- Capacity factor: 42.4% (average 2012-2017)
- Annual net output: 1,572 GW·h

External links
- Website: bluecanyonwindfarm.com
- Commons: Related media on Commons

Blue Canyon Wind Farm is a large wind farm in Oklahoma, United States. The project, located in the Slick Hills north of Lawton, consists of four phases with a total output of 423.45 MW. While Blue Canyon was Oklahoma's largest wind farm as of 2008, it has since been surpassed by larger facilities.

== Blue Canyon I ==
Blue Canyon I consists of 45 Vestas NM72 1.65 MW wind turbines, with a collective nameplate capacity of 74.25 MW. It began commercial operations in December 2003, and is owned by EDP Renewables North America and Energent, L.P. Infrastructure Fund.

== Blue Canyon II ==
Blue Canyon II consists of 84 Vestas V80 1.8 MW wind turbines, with a collective nameplate capacity of an additional 151.2 MW. It is owned and operated by Horizon Wind Energy, a subsidiary of Energias de Portugal, a world leading Portuguese utility, it began commercial operations in December 2005.

== Blue Canyon V ==
Blue Canyon V consists of 66 GE sle 1.5 MW turbines, with a collective nameplate capacity of an additional 99 MW. It began commercial operations in December 2009.

== Blue Canyon VI ==
Blue Canyon VI consists of 55 Vestas V90 1.8 MW turbines, with a collective nameplate capacity of an additional 99 MW.

== Electricity production ==
Blue Canyon Wind Farm Generation (MW·h)
Year	Blue Canyon I (74.25 MW)	Blue Canyon II (151.2 MW)	Blue Canyon V (99 MW)	Blue Canyon VI (99 MW)	Total Annual MW·h
2003	9,336	-	-	-	9,336
2004	264,306	-	-	-	264,306
2005	247,638	28,589	-	-	276,227
2006	262,768	530,454	-	-	793,222
2007	205,672	443,074	-	-	648,746
2008	266,034	551,761	-	-	817,795
2009	268,033	543,258	82,018	-	893,309
2010	245,803	507,275	337,373	-	1,090,451
2011	274,443	551,496	388,560	12,249	1,226,748
2012	272,563	560,207	382,523	403,693	1,618,986
2013	261,998	532,394	376,474	402,493	1,573,359
2014	272,342	545,294	393,186	424,776	1,635,598
2015	236,371	497,693	399,255	379,700	1,513,019
2016	254,212	529,086	365,241	409,650	1,558,189
2017	247,587	530,465	371,057	383,248	1,532,357
Average Annual Production (years 2012-2017) --->					1,571,918
Average Capacity Factor (years 2012-2017) --->					42.4%

== Illustrations of Blue Canyon Wind Farm ==
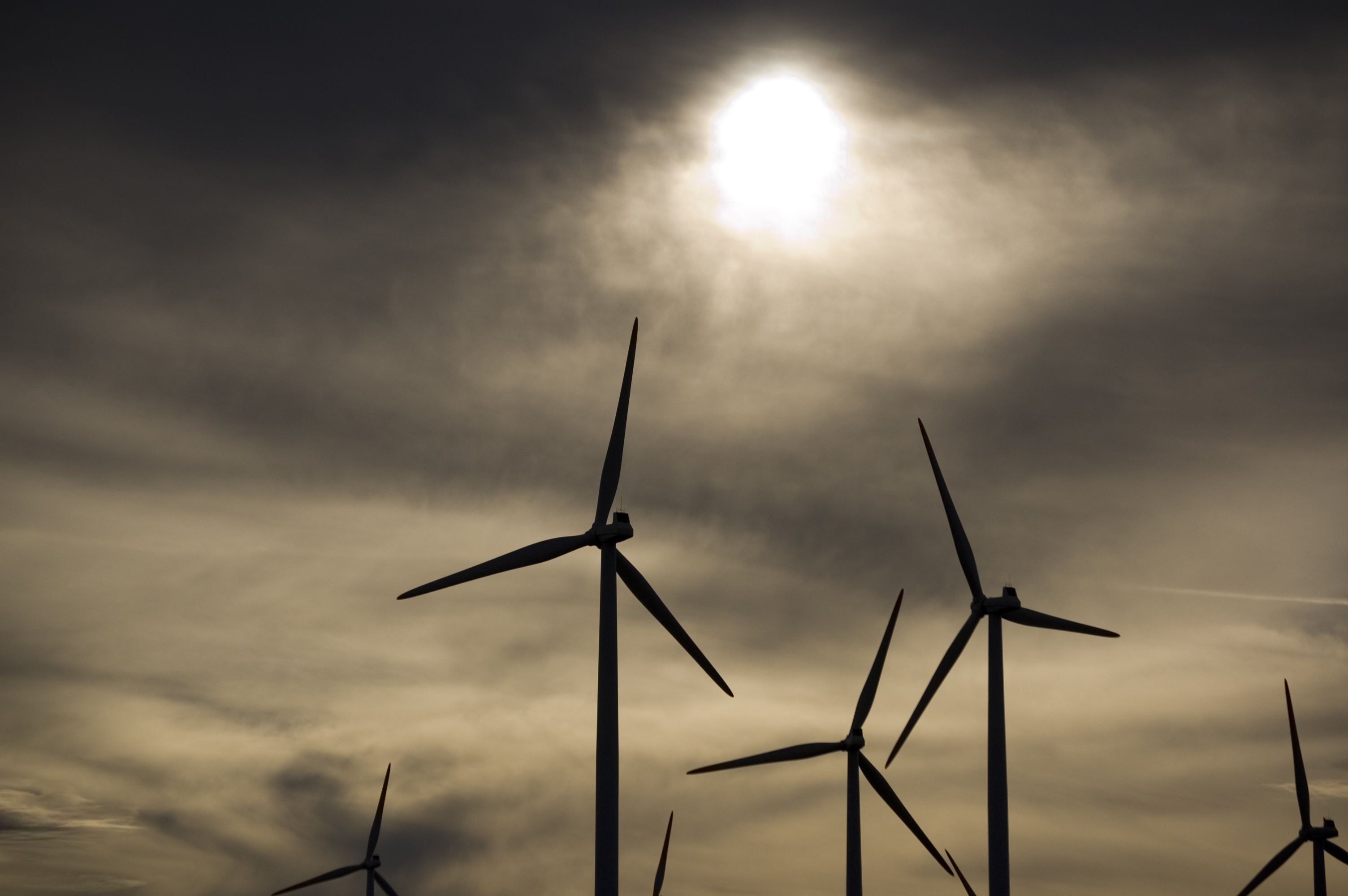
View of the electricity generation wind farm geographically northeast at Meers, Oklahoma

== See also ==
- List of large wind farms
- Wind power in Oklahoma
- Wind power in the United States

== Archive Resources ==
- Everett, Dianna. "Rural Electrification". The Encyclopedia of Oklahoma History and Culture. Oklahoma Historical Society.
- Greene, Scott; Stadler, Steve. "Wind Energy". The Encyclopedia of Oklahoma History and Culture. Oklahoma Historical Society.
