= NeuConnect =

Under construction submarine power cable in Europe

NeuConnect Interconnector
- Map of NeuConnect Interconnector

Location
- Country: Germany, United Kingdom
- General direction: east-west
- From: Germany
- Passes through: North Sea
- To: England

Construction information
- Expected: Completion 2028

Technical information
- Type: submarine cable
- Current type: HVDC
- Total length: 725 km (450 mi)
- Capacity: 1,400 MW
- AC voltage: 380 kV GER/400 kV UK
- DC voltage: 525 kV

NeuConnect is a high-voltage direct current submarine power cable under construction since 2023 between the Isle of Grain, England and Wilhelmshaven Germany, expected to operate in 2028. It will be the first interconnector between the UK and Germany. The cost of £2.4 billion (€2.8 billion) is financed by Meridiam from France, Allianz Capital Partners from Germany, Kansai Electric Power Company from Japan, and Tokyo Electric Power Company from Japan. The Chair of NeuConnect is Julia Prescot CBE.

== Project status ==
The main construction phase started in 2023. As of June 2023, operation was expected to start in 2028. On 21 May 2024, Gregory Hands and Robert Habeck made a symbolic groundbreaking in Germany. As of November 2024, subsea cabling works had started in UK waters.

== Route ==
The cable will run between a new substation on the Isle of Grain, in Kent in England to the Fedderwarden substation in Wilhelmshaven in the Lower Saxony region of Germany. Landfall will be next to Grain Coastal Park, in Kent, and at Hooksiel, near Wilhelmshaven in Germany.

At 725 km in length, the interconnector will be one of the longest worldwide.

== Economics ==
As of 2022 the project was expected to cost £2.4 billion (€2.8 billion). The project is expected to deliver £1.7 billion in consumer benefits to UK consumers over 25 years, and could deliver a net reduction in carbon emissions of over 13 Mt CO_{2} in the same time.

The project is privately financed by Meridiam from France, Allianz Capital Partners from Germany, Kansai Electric Power Company from Japan, and Tokyo Electric Power Company from Japan. It is planned to exchange electricity on days with excess production on one side and a deficit on the other side of the Channel, as both countries have been expanding their wind turbine capacities and production has become more volatile. Britain, a net electricity importer where 5.4 percent of its 2020 demand was covered from abroad, hopes that the connection will lead to lower electricity costs for consumers, where the price of electricity had been permanently higher than in Germany.

== Technical specification ==
The HVDC link will consist of two main cables, each approximately 720 km (450 miles) long, together with a much thinner fibre optic cable for temperature and acoustic sensing for about 150 km (93 miles) from each landfall. The DC element will operate at 525 kV, with a maximum capacity of 1,400 MW.

== History ==
Mathew Brett, Andrew Newbery and Lorne Gifford were the founders of Greenage Power Limited, which originated and first developed the NeuConnect project. The NeuConnect project was conceived in 2015 and the early stage developers applied to Ofgem for an Initial Project Assessment in 2016.

Historically, both countries already have had interconnectors through the North Sea with other countries. Britain as net electricity importer has interconnectors with France, Ireland and the Netherlands, and NordLink opened in 2021 between Norwegian hydropower plants and German wind power. NeuConnect will become the first direct interconnector between the UK and Germany.

Neuconnect Britain Ltd. was established in 2018 following Ofgem awarding the project in principle approval. Public consultation events were held in July 2019. In December 2019, the planning application was submitted to Medway Council and invitations to Tender were launched. In January 2020, the Federal Network Agency in Germany (BNetzA) confirmed the NeuConnect interconnector project in its 2019–2030 grid development plan. In April 2020, NeuConnect completed site survey work near Grain Power Station and BritNed on the Isle of Grain. A €1.2 billion cable contract was awarded in February 2022, and substations contract in April.

In July 2022, the project reached financial close, allowing early construction works to begin later in 2022. In August 2022, Tokyo Electric Power Company announced that they would be acquiring a 6.5% interest in the project through the acquisition of FI1 Limited (an affiliate of Greenage Power). In October 2022, the cable manufacturer Prysmian started production of the 725 km cable. In December 2022, early construction works commenced in Wilhelmshaven and Isle of Grain, and manufacture of the cable had started. In November 2024, subsea cabling works started in UK waters. The project is still expected to be operational by 2028.

== See also ==
- Icelink
- North Sea Link
- Nemo Link
- NordLink
- BritNed
