= Electricity sector in Norway =

Electricity sector of Norway
Data
- Installed capacity (2021): 40.26 GW
- Production (2021): 157.113 TWh (565,610 TJ)
- Share of fossil energy: 1%
- Share of renewable energy: 99%
- GHG emissions from electricity generation (2007): 0.8 Mt CO_{2}
- Average electricity use (2008): 27 MWh annually per capita

Consumption by sector (% of total)
- Residential: 34.2 (2021)
- Industrial: 44.5 (2021)
- Commercial: 21.3 (2021)

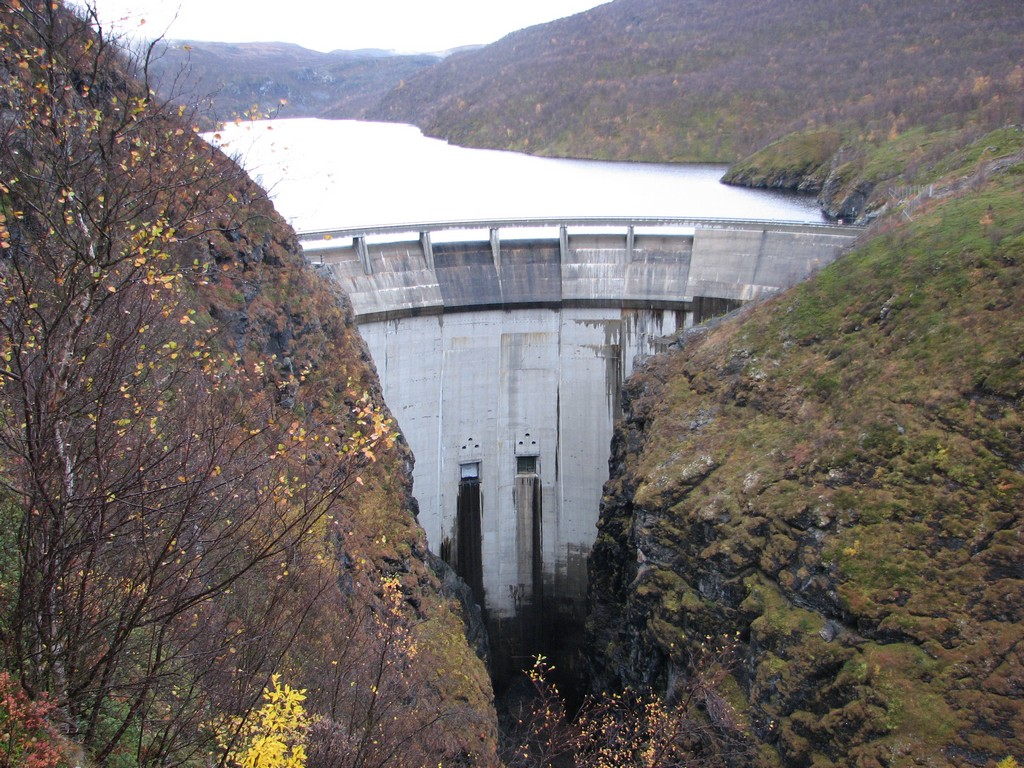
Dam in Alta Municipality, one of Norway's 937 hydropower stations that provide 98% of the nation's power

The electricity sector in Norway relies predominantly on hydroelectricity. A significant share of the total electrical production is consumed by national industry.

== Production and consumption ==
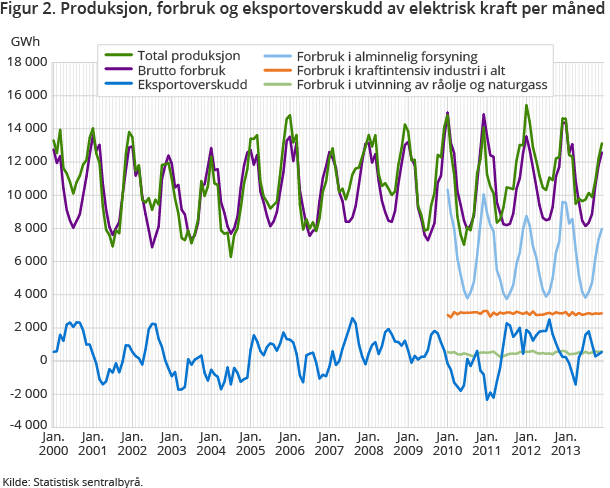
Production, consumption and export of electrical energy in Norway. Source: Statistisk sentralbyrå. www.ssb.no

Average annual hydropower generation capacity in 2019 was around 131 TWh, about 95% of total electricity production.

Of the total production in 2011 of 128 TWh; 122 TWh was from hydroelectric plants, 4795 GWh was from thermal power, and 1283 GWh was wind generated. In the same year, the total consumption was 114 TWh. Hydro production can vary 60 TWh between years, depending on amount of precipitation, and the remaining hydro potential is about 34 TWh.

In 2016, the Norwegian government published a white paper regarding their future energy intentions through 2030. This announcement emphasized four main goals, which were improving security in the supply of their power, improving the efficiency of their renewables, making their energy more efficient, and more environment- and climate-sensitive, and fostering economic development and value through fiscally responsible and renewable technology.

The annual electricity consumption was about 26-27 MWh per inhabitant during 2004-2009 when the European union (EU15) average in 2008 was 7.4 MWh. Norway’s consumption of electricity was over three times higher per person compared to the EU 15 average in 2008. The domestic electricity supply promotes use of electricity, and it is the most common energy source for heating floors and hot water.

== Electricity per person and by power source ==
Electricity per person in Norway (kWh/ inhab.)
	Use	Production	Import	Imp./Exp. %	Fossil	Nuclear	Nuc. %	Other RE*	Bio+waste	Wind	Non RE use**	RE %*
2004	26,601	24,096	2,505	9.4%	105	0	0%	23,893	98		2,610	90.2%
2005	27,297	29,894	-2,597	-9.5%	108	0	0%	29,701	84		-2,488	109.1%
2006	27,349	29,490	-2.141	-7.8%	167	0	0%	29,195	128		-1,974	107.2%
2008	27,398	30,355	-2,957	-10.8%	151	0	0%	30,130	74		-2,806	110.2%
2009	25,691	27,549	-1,858	-7.2%	919	0	0%	26,388	63	209*	-969	103.8%
2014										431		
2015										484		
* Other RE is waterpower, solar and geothermal electricity and windpower until 2008 ** Non RE use = use – production of renewable electricity RE % = (production of RE / use) * 100% Note: EU calculates the share of renewable energies in gross electrical consumption.

== Transmission ==
External image
- Grid map of Scandinavia, 2020

Statnett is the transmission system operator in Norway, operating 11,000 km of high power lines. There are plans to upgrade the western grid from 300 to 420 kV at a cost of 8 billion NOK, partly to accommodate cables to Germany and England.

Norway has an open electric market, integrated with the other Nordic countries over the Synchronous grid of Northern Europe. Export and import is routine over the direct power links to Sweden, Denmark, and the Netherlands. The market is handled by Nord Pool, and has 5 price zones in Norway. Financial future contracts are traded at NASDAQ OMX. Many of the hydroelectric plants in Norway are easily adjustable and can adapt well to variations in demand, and hence in price, but frequency stability is not satisfactory, and Statnett works with producers to minimize sudden changes in power flow. On a normal day, when price is low during nighttime, Norway normally imports power, and exports during daytime when the price is higher. Maintaining the grid in the harsh Norwegian nature is a compromise between stability desires and economy, and outages are expected in these circumstances. The IT-nett, about 70% of the grid, is not grounded.

West of Oslo, there is a small single-phase AC power grid operated with 16.7 Hz frequency for power supply of electric railways.

== Price ==
In some years, a combination of high power prices in the market and less than usual rainfall renders the power system more vulnerable to power shortages. So far consumers in Norway have noted this by paying a higher price for electrical power during winter, however still a low price in international terms. Copious snow- and rain-fall in the mild winters of 2013-15 led to sharply lower prices, which was 26.7 øre per kWh in 2015.

New connections to other countries could stabilize available power levels and reduce price swings, however as these areas are more expensive, average price may rise in Norway. Grid strengthening may cost a few billion kroner.

== Mode of production ==
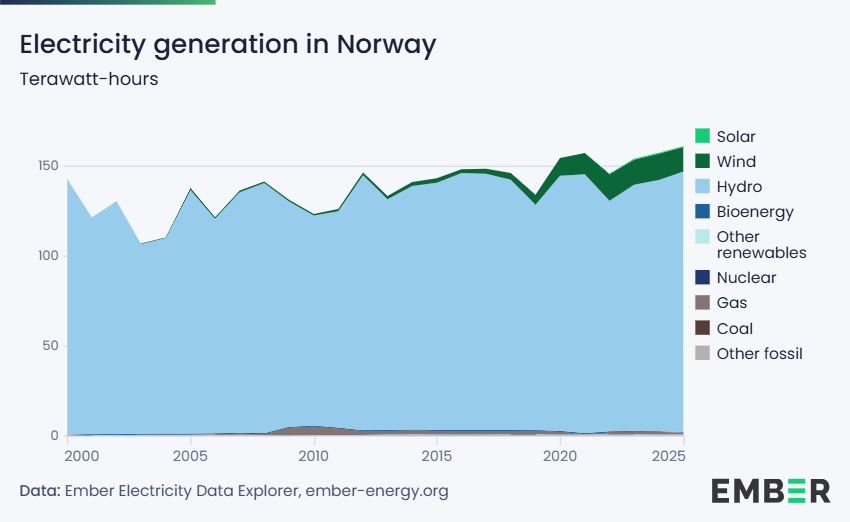
Electricity generation in Norway in terawatt-hours

=== Hydroelectricity ===
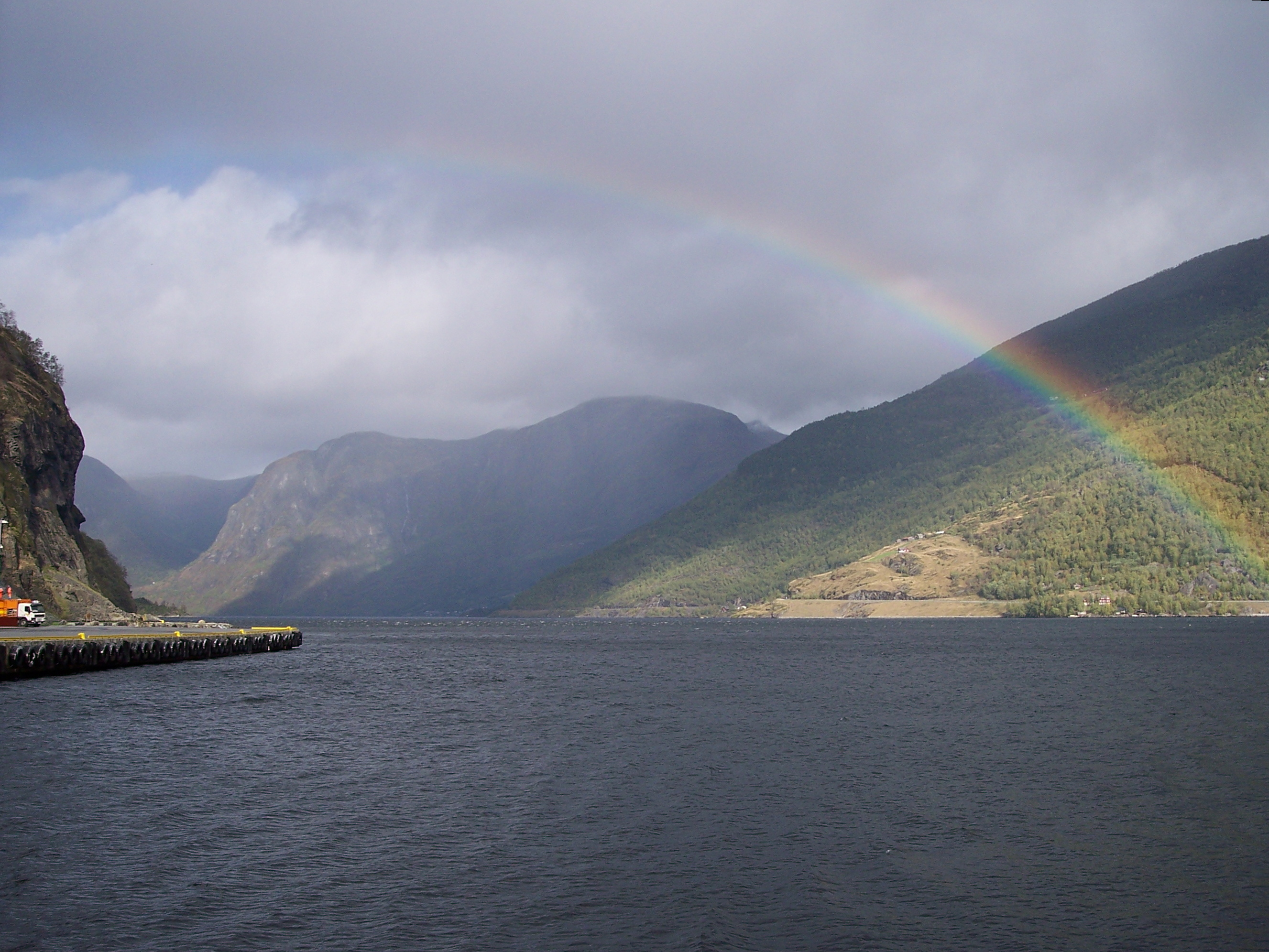
Typical Norwegian geography

Hydroelectric power is the main mode of electricity production. Norway is known for its particular expertise in the development of efficient, environment-friendly hydroelectric power plants. Calls to power Norway principally through hydropower emerged as early as 1892, coming in the form a letter by future Prime Minister Gunnar Knudsen to parliament. Ninety percent of hydropower capacity is publicly owned and distributed across municipalities and counties. Nationwide installed capacity of hydropower amounted to 33.8 GW in 2015. The maximum working volume of hydrologic storage power plants is 85 TWh, whereas the average seasonal cycle is 42 terawatt-hours (TWh). In 2015, hydroelectricity generated 144 TWh and accounted for 95.8% of the national electricity demand. In European markets, it is the single largest producer of hydropower. According to the IEA, Norway generated 4.3 percent of the worldwide hydropower in 2008 and ranked 6th for that year, behind China, Canada, Brazil, the United States and Russia.

Part of the reason that so much of Norway’s electricity can be generated from hydropower is due to the natural advantage of its topography, with abundant steep valleys and rivers. Due to climate change, the region is currently experiencing heavier rainfall and is projected to receive more in the future, further increasing its capacity for hydropower.

=== Wind power ===
Wind power capacity was at the end of 2019 2444 MW producing 5.5 TWh, an increase of about 780 MW (2.5 TWh) in 2019.

In 2021, 64 wind farms had total installed wind power capacity of 4,649 MW with 706 MW of onshore power being added in 2021. Electricity produced in 2021 being 11.8 TWh or 8.5% of Norway's needs.

=== Solar power ===
Solar PV capacity in Norway reached 616 MW in 2023, up from just 11 MW in 2013.

Effective 2024, a 2023 law passed by parliament requires solar power on new government buildings. The same law sets a target of 8 terawatt hours (TWh) of solar electricity generation by 2030, which equates to 5% of total 2022-2023 generation levels. For comparison, solar power produced 0.1% of Norway's electricity generation in 2023.

Solar companies include Elkem Solar and NorSun. Renewable Energy Corporation REC was a solar power company with headquarters in Norway and Singapore. Elkem Solar was part of Norwegian Elkem. Orkla Group sold it with $2 billion in January 2011 to a Chinese chemical company China National Bluestar head office in Beijing. NorSun is a private solar cell producer.

=== Coal power ===
On the island of Svalbard about 0.108 TWh of electricity and heat is produced annually, in two coal fired power plants. The coal is mined on the island, where the surplus of coal (2/3 of production) is exported.

=== Other types ===
Norway has around 3 power plants burning natural gas, depending on how they are counted: Mongstad 280 MW CHP, Kårstø 420 MW (now closed), and Tjeldbergodden 150 MW (unused). They are rarely used, as hydropower is usually cheaper.

Statkraft experiments with osmosis at Tofte.

== Export/Import ==
Norway has imported up to 10% of its electricity production during 2004-2009. According to IEA, in 2015, Norway exports about 15% of its electricity generation and imports about 5%, and the net electricity export was 14.645 TWh. In 2021, exports were 24.7 TWh and imports 7.6 TWh, mostly from Sweden.

Norway and Sweden's grids have long been connected across the 1630 km long border. A 1 GW 420 kV high-voltage link between Nea River station in Norway and Järpen (Järpströmmen station at Indalsälven river) in Sweden was commissioned in 2009. Beginning in 1977 the Norwegian and Danish grids were connected across the Skagerrak with 500 MW, growing to 1,700 MW in 2015. Norway's grid is connected to the Netherlands across the North Sea since 2008 with the 580-kilometre 700 MW High-voltage direct current cable NorNed. The slightly shorter but with 1400 megawatt twice as powerful NordLink HVDC undersea cable connection to Northern Germany began operation in 2021, more or less replacing the Brokdorf Nuclear Power Plant which was shut down at the end of 2021, and helping Norway save hydro power when Germany has a surplus of renewable energy.

The North Sea Link HVDC Norway to Great Britain cable was opened in October 2021, while the Scotland–Norway interconnector NorthConnect is on hold due to Norwegian policy.

== See also ==
- Energy in Norway
- Renewable energy in Norway
- Norwegian Water Resources and Energy Directorate

Regional:

- Nordic energy market
