= HVDC Norway–Germany =

HVDC Norway–Germany may refer to the following proposed high-voltage direct current interconnection projects between Norway and Germany:

- NORD.LINK
- NorGer
