= Climate of Norway =

Köppen climate zones of Norway 1991-2020; 0 °C (32 °F) for coldest month dividing C and D climates

The climate of Norway is more temperate than expected for high latitudes. This is mainly due to the North Atlantic Current with its extension, the Norwegian Current, raising the air temperature; the prevailing southwesterlies bringing mild air onshore; and the general southwest–northeast orientation of the coast, which allows the westerlies to penetrate into the Arctic. The January average in Brønnøysund is 15 °C (59 °F) higher than the January average in Nome, Alaska, even though both towns are situated on the west coast of the continents at 65°N. In July the difference is reduced to 3.2 °C (37.8 °F). The January average of Yakutsk, in Siberia but slightly further south, is −42.3 °C (−44.1 °F) lower than in Brønnøysund.

== Precipitation ==
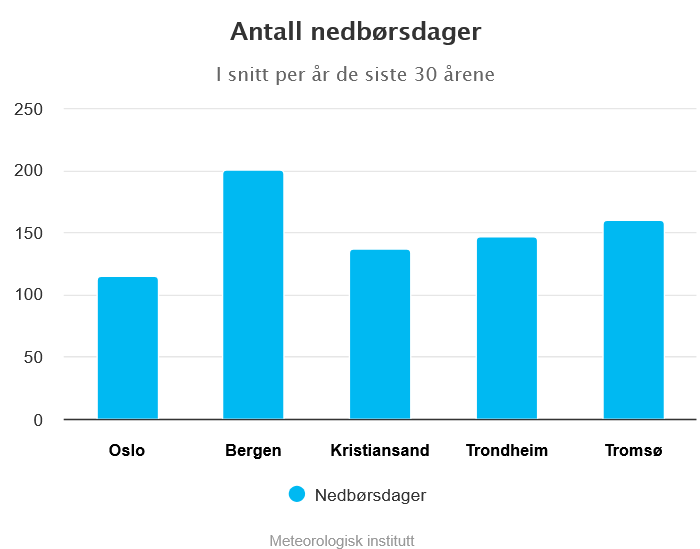
Days with at least 1 mm precipitation; Meterologisk institutt.

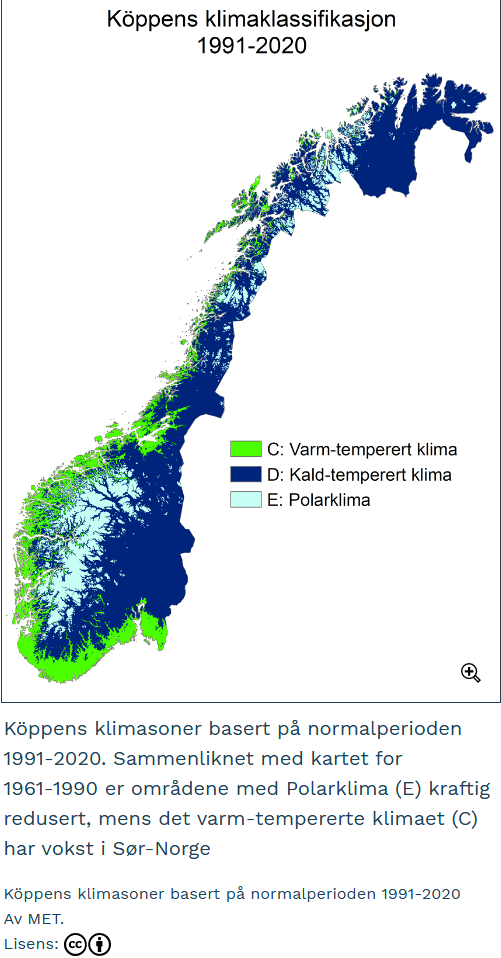
Climate zones in Norway 1991-2020 based on Köppen's main climate zones.

Norway is among Europe's wettest countries, but with large variation in precipitation amount due to the terrain with mountain chains resulting in orographic precipitation but also creating rain shadows. In some regions, locations with vastly different precipitation amounts can be fairly close. Stryn Municipality (1661 mm) get 6 times as much precipitation as Skjåk 90 minutes drive away, Bergen has five times as much precipitation as Lærdal Municipality in the same region, and in the north Glomfjord (2141 mm) get 10 times as much precipitation as upper Saltdal (81 m) which is 68 km away as the crow flies. Some areas of Vestlandet and southern Nordland are among Europe's wettest, due to orographic lift, particularly where the westerlies are first intercepted by high mountains. This occurs slightly inland from the outer skerry guard. In the updated 1991-2020 normals, Gullfjellet in Bergen (345 m) has the highest annual precipitation with 4,067 mm (160.1 in). Annual precipitation can exceed 5,000 mm (196.9 in) in mountain areas near the coast. Lurøy Municipality at the Arctic Circle gets 3,066 mm (120.7 in) annually, a remarkable amount for a polar location. Precipitation is heaviest in late autumn and winter along the coast, while April to June is the driest. The innermost parts of the long fjords are somewhat drier: annual precipitation in Lærdal Municipality is 514 mm (20.2 in), and in the north only 338 mm (13.3 in) in Skibotn at the head of Lyngenfjord.

The regions east of the mountain chain (including Oslo) have a more continental climate with generally less precipitation, and precipitation peaks in summer and early autumn, while winter and spring tend to be driest. A large area in the interior of Finnmark receive less than 450 mm (17.7 in) of precipitation annually. Some valleys surrounded by mountains get very scarce precipitation, and often need irrigation in summer. The upper part of Saltdal Municipality (81 m, Storjord) has the lowest annual average with only 211 mm (8.3 in), while in the south of Norway, Skjåk Municipality is driest with 295 mm (11.6 in). In Norway's High Arctic archipelagoes, Svalbard Airport has the lowest average annual precipitation with 217 mm (8.5 in), while Jan Mayen get more than double with 648 mm (25.5 in).

Monthly averages vary from 6 mm (0.24 in) in April in upper Saltdal and Skjåk to 509 mm (20.0 in) in December at Gullfjellet. Coastal areas from Lindesnes Municipality north to Vardø Municipality have more than 200 days per year with precipitation; however, this is with a very low threshold value (0.1 mm precipitation). The average annual number of days with at least 3 mm (0.12 in) precipitation is 77 in Blindern/Oslo, 96 in Kjevik/Kristiansand, 158 in Florida/Bergen, 93 in Værnes/Trondheim, and 109 in Tromsø.

== Temperature ==
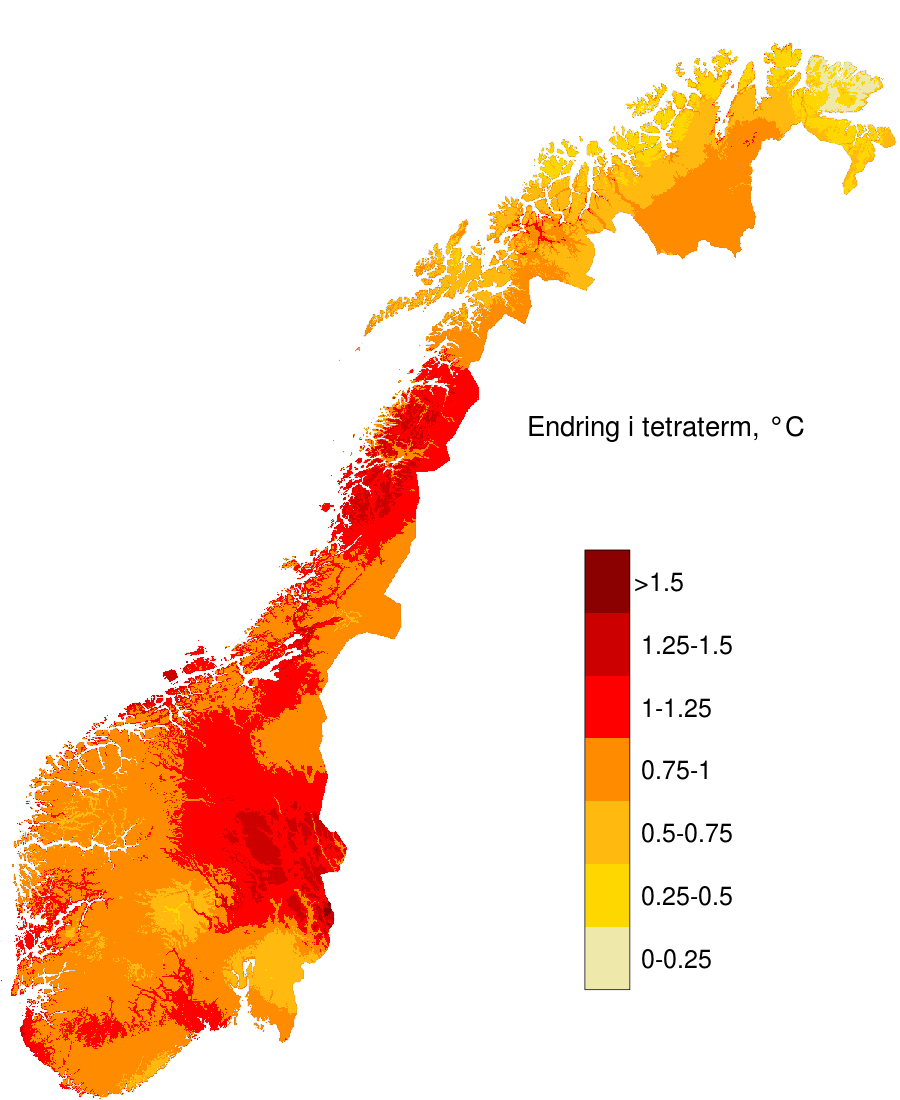
Warmer summers: June–September temperatures 1991-2020 compared to 1961–1990. Strongest warming Oslo to Trondheimsfjord, and in Nordland.

The coast experiences milder winters than other areas at the same latitudes. The average temperature difference between the coldest month and the warmest is only 10–15 °C (18–27 °F) in coastal areas; some lighthouses have a yearly amplitude of just 10 °C (18 °F), such as Svinøy in Herøy Municipality with a coldest month of 3.7 °C (38.7 °F). The differences of inland areas are larger, with a maximum difference of 28 °C (50 °F) in Karasjok Municipality. Finnmarksvidda has the coldest winters in mainland Norway, but inland areas much further south can also experience severe cold. Røros Municipality has recorded −50 °C (−58 °F).

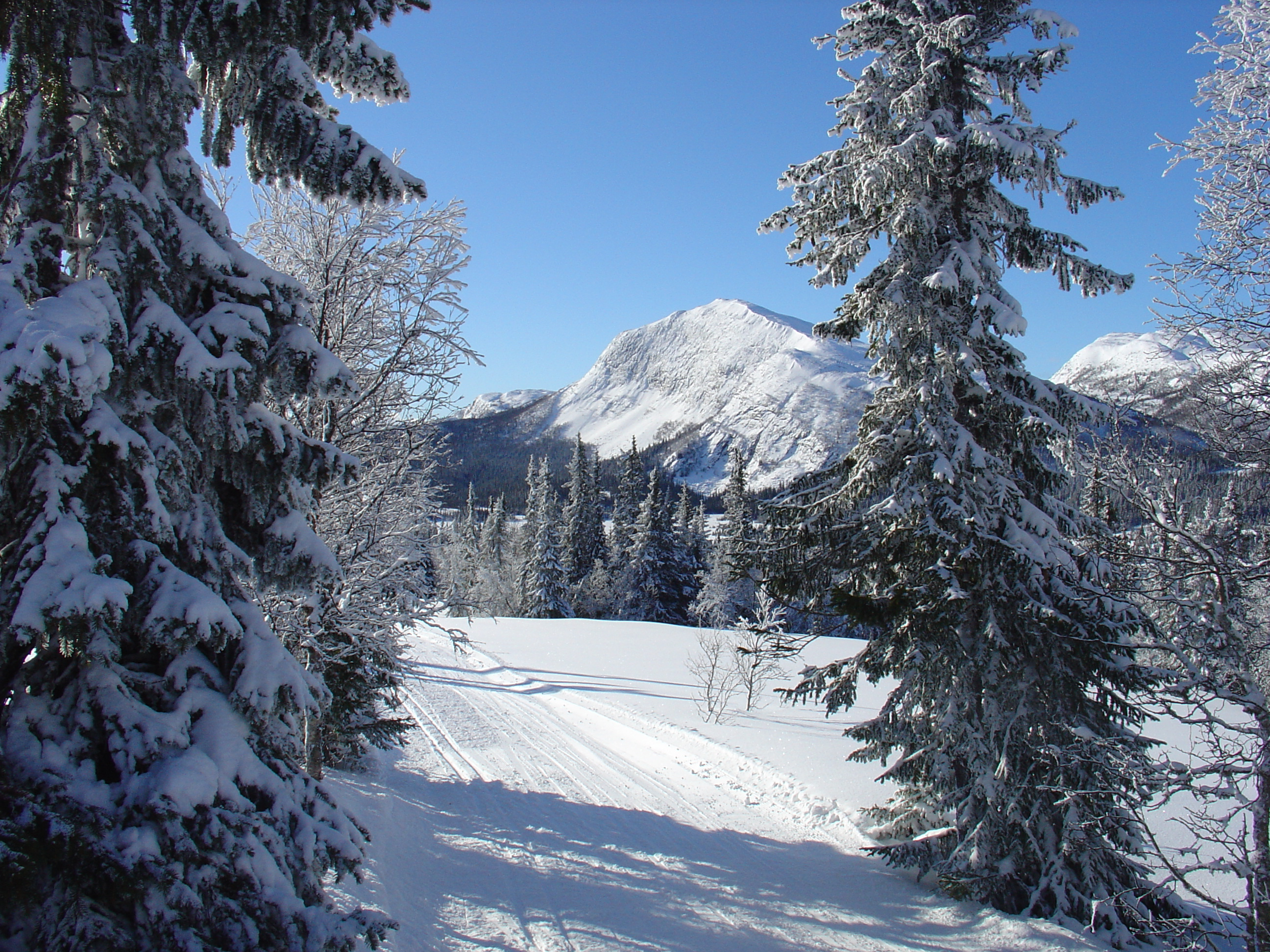
The inland valleys have reliable snow cover in winter; as here in Sigdal. Due to inversion, the valley floor is often colder than the hillsides above during winter.

Bø Municipality is the most northerly location in the world where all winter months have mean temperatures above 0 °C (32 °F). Spring is the season when the temperature differences between the southern and northern part of the country is largest; this is also the time of year when daytime and nighttime temperatures differ the most. Inland valleys and the innermost fjord areas have less wind and see the warmest summer days. The lowland near Oslo is warmest in summer with 24 July-hr average of 18 °C (64.4 °F) and average daily high up to 23 °C (73.4 °F). Inland areas reach their peak warmth around mid-July and coastal areas by the first half of August. Humidity is usually low in summer.

The North Atlantic Current splits in two over the northern part of the Norwegian Sea, one branch going east into the Barents Sea and the other going north along the west coast of Spitsbergen. This modifies the Arctic polar climate somewhat and results in open water throughout the year at higher latitudes than any other place in the Arctic. On the eastern coast of the Svalbard archipelago, the sea used to be frozen during most of the year, but the last years' warming (graph) have seen open waters noticeably longer.

The warmest temperature ever recorded in Norway is 35.6 °C (96.1 °F) in Nesbyen Municipality. The coldest temperature ever is −51.4 °C (−60.5 °F) in Karasjok Municipality. The warmest month on record was July 1901 in Oslo, with a mean 24-hour temperature of 22.7 °C (72.9 °F)), and the coldest month was February 1966 in Karasjok, with a mean of −27.1 °C (−16.8 °F). The warmest night recorded in Norway was July 29, 2019 at Sømna-Kvaløyfjellet (302 m) in Sømn Municipalitya near Brønnøysund with overnight low 26.1 °C (79.0 °F). Atlantic lows bringing mild winds in winter further warmed by foehn can give warm temperatures in narrow fjords in winter: Sunndalsøra has recorded 19 °C (66 °F) in January and 18.9 °C (66.0 °F) in February.

Compared to coastal areas, inland valleys and the innermost fjord areas have larger diurnal temperature variations, especially in spring and summer.

== Sunlight, time zones, and tides ==
Areas in Norway located north of the Arctic Circle have extreme darkness in winter, which increases with latitude. At Longyearbyen on the Svalbard islands in the extreme north, the upper part of the sun's disc is above the horizon from 9 April to 23 August, and winter darkness lasts from 27 October to 14 February. The winter darkness is not as dark on the northern mainland, as there is twilight for a few hours around noon.

The southern part of the country also experiences large seasonal variations in daylight; in Oslo, the sun rises at 03:54 and sets 22:54 at the summer solstice, but is only above the horizon from 09:18 to 15:12 at the winter solstice. The northern part of the country is located in the aurora borealis zone; the aurora is occasionally seen in the southern part of the country as well.

Sunrise and sunset (Note: Measurements from fifteenth of month. Daylight saving in effect from last Sunday in March to last Sunday in October. In Tromsø, the sun is below the horizon until 15 January, but is blocked by mountains until 21 January.)
Municipality	Jan	Feb	Mar	Apr	May	Jun	Jul	Aug	Sep	Oct	Nov	Dec
Kristiansand	09:04–16:12	08:00–17:25	06:45–18:30	06:18–20:40	05:03–21:45	04:23–22:34	04:47–22:20	05:49–21:15	06:56–19:50	08:02–18:24	08:14–16:10	09:08–15:37
Trondheim	09:38–15:18	08:12–16:55	06:38–18:18	05:51–20:48	04:13–22:19	03:04–23:34	03:41–23:05	05:12–21:31	06:41–19:45	08:05–18:02	08:39–15:26	09:55–14:32
Tromsø	11:37–12:10	08:17–15:42	06:08–17:40	04:45–20:47	01:46–23:45	Midnight sun	Midnight sun	03:42–21:51	05:55–19:22	07:53–17:05	09:23–13:33	Polar night

Norway is on Central European Time, corresponding to the 15°E longitude. As the country is very elongated, this is at odds with the local daylight hours in the eastern and western parts. In Vardø, local daylight hours are 64 minutes earlier, and in Bergen, they are 39 minutes later. Thus, Finnmark gains early morning daylight but loses evening daylight, and Vestlandet loses early morning light but gains more evening daylight in this time zone. Daylight saving time (GMT + 2) is observed from the last Sunday in March to the last Sunday in October.

The difference between low tide and high tide is small on the southern coast and large in the north; ranging from on average 0.17 m in Mandal to about 0.30 m in Oslo and Stavanger, 0.90 m in Bergen, 1.80 m in Trondheim, Bodø and Hammerfest and as much as 2.17 m in Vadsø.

== Examples ==
=== Table ===
Climate data for some locations in Norway; base period 1991-2020 (temperatures are 24-hr mean)
Location	Elevation	Mean temperature (°C)						Precip	Köppen climate zone	Snow >25 cm (days)
Location	Elevation	Jan	Apr	Jul	Sep	Nov	Year	Precip	Köppen climate zone	Snow >25 cm (days)
Blindern/Oslo	94 m	-2.3	6.2	17.7	12.2	2.2	7	836 mm	Cfb/Dfb	30
Oslo Airport, Gardermoen	202 m	-4.4	4.6	16.5	10.6	0.5	5.4	866 mm	Dfb	76
Lillehammer	240 m	-6.1	4	16.1	10.1	-1.2	4.4	715 mm	Dfb	108
Tynset	482 m	-9.1	1.5	13.7	7.5	-3.7	1.4	439 mm	Dfc	-
Geilo	772 m	-6.2	0.5	12.4	7.4	-2.8	2.0	699 mm	Dfc	67
Sognefjellhytta in Lom Municipality (Sognefjell)	1413 m	-8.6	-4.3	7.4	2.9	-5.5	-2	948 mm	ET	244
Sarpsborg	57 m	-1.4	5.8	17.4	12.2	3.1	7.2	887 mm	Cfb/Dfb	-
Notodden	20 m	-4.5	5.6	17.1	11.2	0.6	5.7	741 mm	Dfb	-
Kjevik/Kristiansand	12 m	0.2	6	16.6	12.4	4	7.6	1381 mm	Cfb	21
Sola/Stavanger	7 m	2.6	6.9	15.3	13.2	5.7	8.4	1256 mm	Cfb	0
Bergen	12 m	2.6	7.2	15.6	12.6	5.3	8.4	2495 mm	Cfb	3
Lærdalsøyri	24 m	-0.7	6.4	15.9	10.9	2.2	6.7	508 mm	Cfb/Dfb	0
Årø/Molde	3 m	1.1	5.7	15.4	11.4	3.9	7.1	1640 mm	Cfb	54
Røros Airport/Røros	625 m	-8.5	0.2	12.4	6.9	-4.1	1.1	525 mm	Dfc	136
Værnes/Trondheim	12 m	-1.1	5.1	15.2	11	1.7	6.1	823 mm	Cfb/Dfb	14
Brønnøysund Airport/Brønnøysund	5 m	1.1	4.7	14.3	11.1	4	6.6	1510 mm	Cfb	9
Bodø Airport/Bodø	11 m	-0.5	3.4	13.6	10.1	2.6	5.5	1117 mm	Cfb/Dfb	23
Bardufoss	76 m	-9.7	0.6	13.7	7.4	-4.7	1.3	703 mm	Dfc	126
Holt/Tromsø	20 m	-2.1	1.7	12.4	8.3	1	3.9	958 mm	Cfc/Dfc	160
Kautokeino (Finnmarksvidda)	307 m	-14.1	-3	13.4	6	-8.4	-1.4	424 mm	Dfc	135
Alta Airport/Alta	3 m	-6.8	0.4	13.7	8.2	-2.8	2.3	438 mm	Dfc	-
Vardø	10 m	-3.5	0.3	10	7.8	-0.2	2.5	623 mm	Dfc	-
Jan Mayen	10 m	-2.9	-2.1	5.7	4.5	-1	0.5	643 mm	ET (oceanic tundra)	-
Longyearbyen/Svalbard	28 m	-10.9	-8.8	7	2	-6.4	-3.9	217 mm	ET	34
If coldest winter month is between −3 °C (27 °F) and 0 °C (32 °F) the climate zone is named as Cfb/Dfb (or Cfc/Dfc) as Europe and US use different winter thresholds between C/D climates. Cfb=temperate oceanic/marine west coast; Dfb=humid continental; Cfc=subpolar oceanic (cold oceanic); Dfc=boreal/subarctic; ET=polar tundra or alpine tundra. Sep and Nov used to illustrates different climate zones better. Sognefjellhytta: Mountain lodge along Sognefjellsvegen west of Jotunheimen.Snow: Number of days/year with at least 25 cm (9.8 in) snow on the ground; 1971–2000 base period. Due to warming most lowland areas have less snow in recent years. Snow data from nearby: Rørvik for Brønnøysund, Karasjok for Kautokeino, Tromsø snow from 100 m ASL; Molde snow 1979 - 87. Some locations have Feb colder than Jan; some coastal stations have Aug warmer than Jul.

As seen from the table, Norway's climate shows large variations, but all populated areas of the Norwegian mainland have temperate or subarctic climates (Köppen groups C and D). Svalbard and Jan Mayen have a polar climate (Köppen group E).

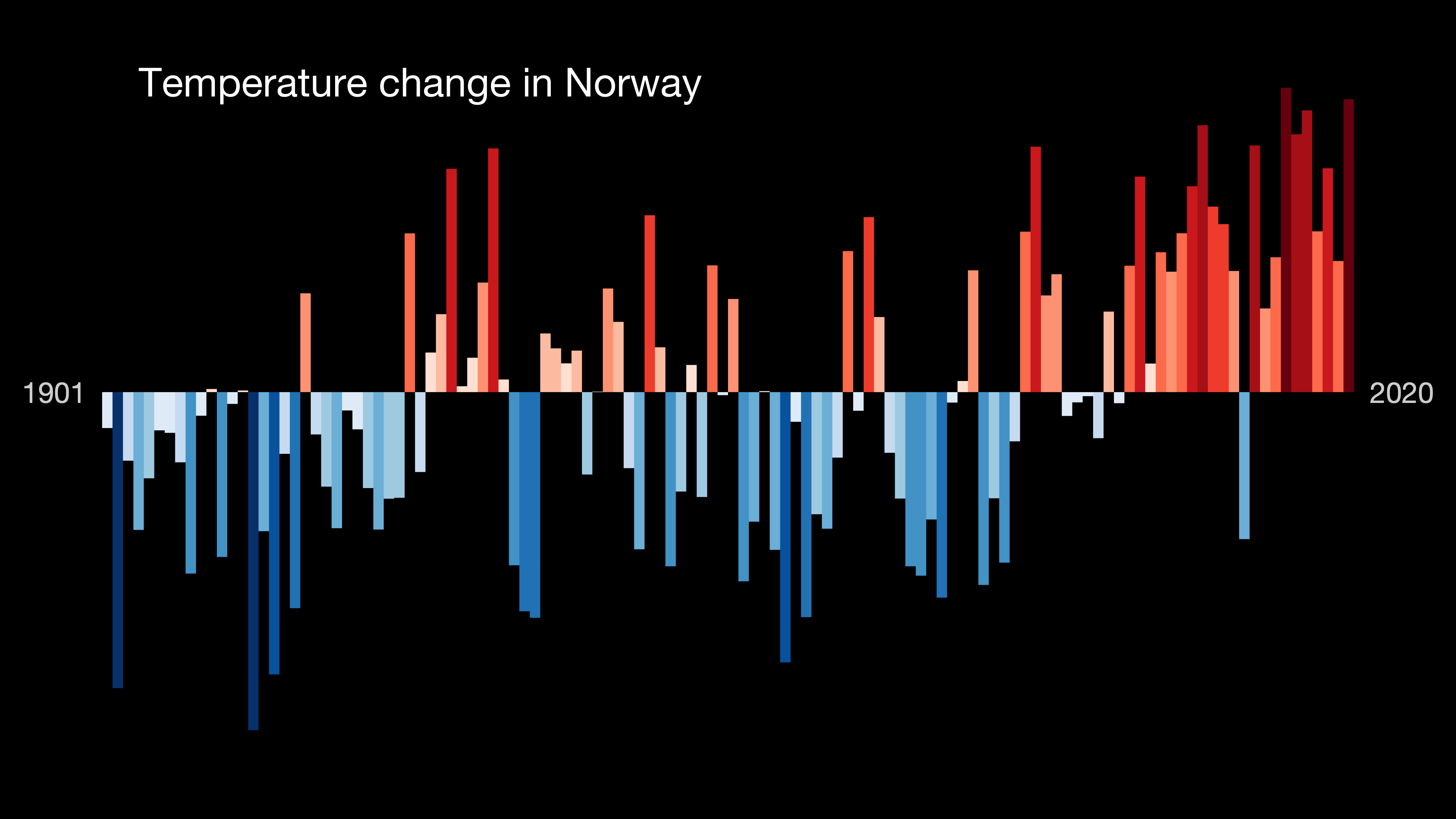
Temperature in Norway 1901-2020

As a consequence of warming since 1990, summers are warmer and longer and winters are getting shorter and milder. With the new official 1991-2020 climate normal, many areas have seen their climate change to a new climate zone compared to 1961-90 normal. Oslo's climate has moved from Dfb to Cfb/Dfb, Lillehammer's from Dfc to Dfb, Kristiansand from Cfb/Dfb to Cfb, Molde and Brønnøysund from Cfc/Dfc to Cfb, Trondheim from Dfc to Cfb/Dfb, Bodø from Cfc/Dfc to Cfb/Dfb, Tromsø (Holt) from Dfc to Cfc/Dfc and Vardø from ET to Dfc. Snow cover has decreased in most populated areas due to winter warming; days/year with 25 cm snow cover in 1991-2020 is 26 days in Oslo (94 m), 2 days in Bergen, 8 days in Trondheim/Værnes and 144 days in Tromsø. The strongest warming has been observed on Svalbard. In addition to warming, precipitation has increased in most areas, especially in winter, increasing erosion and the risk of landslides.

=== Weatherboxes ===
Climate data for Oslo - Blindern 1991-2020 (Köppen: Cfb/Dfb) (94 m, extremes since 1900)
Month	Jan	Feb	Mar	Apr	May	Jun	Jul	Aug	Sep	Oct	Nov	Dec	Year
Record high °C (°F)	12.5 (54.5)	13.8 (56.8)	21.5 (70.7)	25.4 (77.7)	31.1 (88.0)	33.7 (92.7)	35.0 (95.0)	33.6 (92.5)	26.4 (79.5)	21.0 (69.8)	14.4 (57.9)	12.6 (54.7)	35.0 (95.0)
Mean daily maximum °C (°F)	0.1 (32.2)	1.1 (34.0)	5.3 (41.5)	11.0 (51.8)	16.7 (62.1)	20.4 (68.7)	22.7 (72.9)	21.3 (70.3)	16.4 (61.5)	9.6 (49.3)	4.4 (39.9)	0.8 (33.4)	10.8 (51.5)
Daily mean °C (°F)	−2.3 (27.9)	−2 (28)	1.4 (34.5)	6.2 (43.2)	11.4 (52.5)	15.3 (59.5)	17.7 (63.9)	16.5 (61.7)	12.1 (53.8)	6.5 (43.7)	2.2 (36.0)	−1.4 (29.5)	7.0 (44.5)
Mean daily minimum °C (°F)	−4.7 (23.5)	−4.7 (23.5)	−2.1 (28.2)	2.1 (35.8)	6.8 (44.2)	10.8 (51.4)	13.4 (56.1)	12.5 (54.5)	8.6 (47.5)	3.8 (38.8)	-0.0 (32.0)	−3.9 (25.0)	3.6 (38.4)
Record low °C (°F)	−26.0 (−14.8)	−24.9 (−12.8)	−21.3 (−6.3)	−14.9 (5.2)	−3.4 (25.9)	0.7 (33.3)	3.7 (38.7)	3.7 (38.7)	−3.3 (26.1)	−8.0 (17.6)	−16.0 (3.2)	−20.8 (−5.4)	−26.0 (−14.8)
Average precipitation mm (inches)	57.9 (2.28)	45.6 (1.80)	41.3 (1.63)	48.4 (1.91)	60.1 (2.37)	79.7 (3.14)	86.7 (3.41)	102.8 (4.05)	82.2 (3.24)	93.4 (3.68)	84.6 (3.33)	53.6 (2.11)	836.3 (32.95)
Average precipitation days	9.8	7.3	8.5	8.1	8.5	10.1	10.9	10.9	9.4	10.9	10.7	9.2	114.3
Mean monthly sunshine hours	45.1	77.6	146.5	182.0	248.0	230.3	244.1	203.8	150.1	94	50.9	40.0	1,712.4
Average ultraviolet index	0	1	1	3	4	5	5	4	3	1	0	0	2
Source: Seklima

Climate data for Lillehammer 1991-2020 (Dfb) (240 m; extremes 1957 - 2018)
Month	Jan	Feb	Mar	Apr	May	Jun	Jul	Aug	Sep	Oct	Nov	Dec	Year
Record high °C (°F)	10.4 (50.7)	12.5 (54.5)	16.0 (60.8)	23.4 (74.1)	28.5 (83.3)	34.0 (93.2)	32.4 (90.3)	33.0 (91.4)	26.4 (79.5)	19.5 (67.1)	16.2 (61.2)	11.3 (52.3)	34.0 (93.2)
Mean daily maximum °C (°F)	−3.3 (26.1)	−1.8 (28.8)	3.7 (38.7)	9.4 (48.9)	15.4 (59.7)	19.3 (66.7)	21.7 (71.1)	19.9 (67.8)	14.9 (58.8)	7.2 (45.0)	1.2 (34.2)	−2.8 (27.0)	8.7 (47.7)
Daily mean °C (°F)	−6.1 (21.0)	−5.4 (22.3)	−1.2 (29.8)	4 (39)	9.4 (48.9)	13.7 (56.7)	16.1 (61.0)	14.5 (58.1)	10.1 (50.2)	4.1 (39.4)	−1.2 (29.8)	−5.5 (22.1)	4.4 (39.9)
Mean daily minimum °C (°F)	−8.4 (16.9)	−8.1 (17.4)	−4.6 (23.7)	0 (32)	4.5 (40.1)	8.8 (47.8)	11.4 (52.5)	10.1 (50.2)	6.4 (43.5)	1.4 (34.5)	−3.0 (26.6)	−7.6 (18.3)	0.9 (33.6)
Record low °C (°F)	−31.0 (−23.8)	−29.5 (−21.1)	−24.1 (−11.4)	−14.0 (6.8)	−5.4 (22.3)	−2.2 (28.0)	0.5 (32.9)	−0.6 (30.9)	−5.8 (21.6)	−14.5 (5.9)	−22.5 (−8.5)	−31.0 (−23.8)	−31.0 (−23.8)
Average precipitation mm (inches)	52 (2.0)	35 (1.4)	35 (1.4)	35 (1.4)	64 (2.5)	70 (2.8)	80 (3.1)	96 (3.8)	65 (2.6)	69 (2.7)	69 (2.7)	47 (1.9)	717 (28.3)
Mean monthly sunshine hours	28	68	126	168	212	242	237	195	136	83	44	18	1,557
Source 1:
Source 2:

Climate data for Fagernes in Nord-Aurdal Municipality, Valdres (Dfc) 1991-2020 (358 m, extremes 1982-2020)
Month	Jan	Feb	Mar	Apr	May	Jun	Jul	Aug	Sep	Oct	Nov	Dec	Year
Record high °C (°F)	11.6 (52.9)	12.2 (54.0)	15.2 (59.4)	21.5 (70.7)	27.5 (81.5)	31.3 (88.3)	32.3 (90.1)	32.3 (90.1)	26.3 (79.3)	21.7 (71.1)	14.9 (58.8)	11.3 (52.3)	32.3 (90.1)
Mean daily maximum °C (°F)	−3.9 (25.0)	−1.9 (28.6)	3.3 (37.9)	8.8 (47.8)	14.3 (57.7)	18.6 (65.5)	21.2 (70.2)	19.4 (66.9)	14.4 (57.9)	7 (45)	0.9 (33.6)	−3.3 (26.1)	8.2 (46.9)
Daily mean °C (°F)	−7.6 (18.3)	−6.7 (19.9)	−2.4 (27.7)	2.8 (37.0)	8.1 (46.6)	12.8 (55.0)	15.4 (59.7)	13.8 (56.8)	9.4 (48.9)	3.4 (38.1)	−1.8 (28.8)	−6.6 (20.1)	3.4 (38.1)
Mean daily minimum °C (°F)	−11.1 (12.0)	−10.4 (13.3)	−6.4 (20.5)	−1.3 (29.7)	3 (37)	7.8 (46.0)	10.7 (51.3)	9.7 (49.5)	6 (43)	1 (34)	−4.1 (24.6)	−9.6 (14.7)	−0.4 (31.3)
Record low °C (°F)	−36.4 (−33.5)	−34.4 (−29.9)	−29.5 (−21.1)	−18.2 (−0.8)	−4.9 (23.2)	−1.3 (29.7)	1.5 (34.7)	0 (32)	−4.4 (24.1)	−13.4 (7.9)	−23 (−9)	−27.7 (−17.9)	−36.4 (−33.5)
Average precipitation mm (inches)	44.6 (1.76)	26.9 (1.06)	25.1 (0.99)	27.2 (1.07)	55.7 (2.19)	67.2 (2.65)	87.1 (3.43)	88.6 (3.49)	54.6 (2.15)	52.1 (2.05)	53.8 (2.12)	39.9 (1.57)	622.8 (24.53)
Source 1: Norwegian Meteorological Institute
Source 2: NOAA-WMO averages 91-2020 Norway

Climate data for Kristiansand Airport Kjevik 1991–2020 (Cfb) (12 m, extremes 1946–2021, sunhrs 1961–1990)
Month	Jan	Feb	Mar	Apr	May	Jun	Jul	Aug	Sep	Oct	Nov	Dec	Year
Record high °C (°F)	13.9 (57.0)	16.3 (61.3)	21.9 (71.4)	23.7 (74.7)	26.1 (79.0)	30.7 (87.3)	31.2 (88.2)	32.6 (90.7)	27.5 (81.5)	20.4 (68.7)	17.1 (62.8)	13.6 (56.5)	32.6 (90.7)
Mean daily maximum °C (°F)	3.2 (37.8)	3.7 (38.7)	6.2 (43.2)	10.5 (50.9)	15.4 (59.7)	18.9 (66.0)	21.1 (70.0)	20.4 (68.7)	16.5 (61.7)	11.5 (52.7)	6.9 (44.4)	3.9 (39.0)	11.5 (52.7)
Daily mean °C (°F)	0.2 (32.4)	0.2 (32.4)	2.3 (36.1)	6 (43)	10.7 (51.3)	14.4 (57.9)	16.6 (61.9)	15.9 (60.6)	12.4 (54.3)	7.9 (46.2)	4 (39)	0.9 (33.6)	7.6 (45.7)
Mean daily minimum °C (°F)	−2.8 (27.0)	−2.9 (26.8)	−1.3 (29.7)	1.9 (35.4)	5.8 (42.4)	9.7 (49.5)	12 (54)	11.6 (52.9)	8.8 (47.8)	4.5 (40.1)	1 (34)	−2.2 (28.0)	3.8 (39.0)
Record low °C (°F)	−28.2 (−18.8)	−27.9 (−18.2)	−21.7 (−7.1)	−11.7 (10.9)	−4.0 (24.8)	0 (32)	3.7 (38.7)	1.9 (35.4)	−2.3 (27.9)	−8.4 (16.9)	−18.8 (−1.8)	−22.9 (−9.2)	−28.2 (−18.8)
Average precipitation mm (inches)	147.2 (5.80)	98.2 (3.87)	87.5 (3.44)	64.8 (2.55)	80.3 (3.16)	85.5 (3.37)	80.6 (3.17)	120.7 (4.75)	134.3 (5.29)	169.7 (6.68)	161.3 (6.35)	151.4 (5.96)	1,381.5 (54.39)
Average precipitation days (≥ 1.0 mm)	15	12	10	9	9	9	10	12	12	14	15	15	142
Mean monthly sunshine hours	45	84	121	187	228	274	269	231	150	93	57	39	1,778
Source 1: Seklima
Source 2: NOAA-WMO averages 91-2020 Norway

Climate data for Bergen 1991-2020 (Cfb) (12 m, Florida/met.office), sunshine 2016-2023
Month	Jan	Feb	Mar	Apr	May	Jun	Jul	Aug	Sep	Oct	Nov	Dec	Year
Record high °C (°F)	16.9 (62.4)	13.5 (56.3)	19.8 (67.6)	25.5 (77.9)	31.2 (88.2)	30.3 (86.5)	33.4 (92.1)	31.0 (87.8)	27.1 (80.8)	23.8 (74.8)	17.9 (64.2)	13.9 (57.0)	33.4 (92.1)
Mean maximum °C (°F)	9.6 (49.3)	9.2 (48.6)	12.1 (53.8)	18 (64)	23.1 (73.6)	25.1 (77.2)	27.2 (81.0)	26.2 (79.2)	22 (72)	17.5 (63.5)	13 (55)	10.4 (50.7)	27.2 (81.0)
Mean daily maximum °C (°F)	4.7 (40.5)	4.9 (40.8)	6.9 (44.4)	11.1 (52.0)	15 (59)	17.7 (63.9)	19.6 (67.3)	19.4 (66.9)	16.1 (61.0)	11.7 (53.1)	7.6 (45.7)	5.3 (41.5)	11.7 (53.0)
Daily mean °C (°F)	2.6 (36.7)	2.3 (36.1)	3.8 (38.8)	7.2 (45.0)	10.7 (51.3)	13.6 (56.5)	15.6 (60.1)	15.4 (59.7)	12.6 (54.7)	8.6 (47.5)	5.3 (41.5)	3.1 (37.6)	8.4 (47.1)
Mean daily minimum °C (°F)	0.6 (33.1)	0.1 (32.2)	1.3 (34.3)	3.9 (39.0)	6.9 (44.4)	10.1 (50.2)	12.4 (54.3)	12.4 (54.3)	9.9 (49.8)	6.1 (43.0)	3.1 (37.6)	1 (34)	5.6 (42.2)
Mean minimum °C (°F)	−6.1 (21.0)	−6.1 (21.0)	−4.5 (23.9)	−1.2 (29.8)	1.8 (35.2)	5.6 (42.1)	8.2 (46.8)	8.0 (46.4)	4.4 (39.9)	0.1 (32.2)	−3.2 (26.2)	−5.7 (21.7)	−6.1 (21.0)
Record low °C (°F)	−16.3 (2.7)	−13.4 (7.9)	−12.0 (10.4)	−5.5 (22.1)	−3.2 (26.2)	0.8 (33.4)	2.5 (36.5)	2.5 (36.5)	−0.1 (31.8)	−5.5 (22.1)	−9.5 (14.9)	−13.7 (7.3)	−16.3 (2.7)
Average precipitation mm (inches)	256.3 (10.09)	209.3 (8.24)	201.7 (7.94)	140.6 (5.54)	108.5 (4.27)	132.3 (5.21)	157.5 (6.20)	207.9 (8.19)	248.5 (9.78)	268.1 (10.56)	275.1 (10.83)	289.8 (11.41)	2,495.6 (98.26)
Average precipitation days (≥ 1.0 mm)	19	18	18	14	13	13	15	17	17	18	19	19	200
Average relative humidity (%)	78	76	73	72	72	76	77	78	79	79	78	79	76
Mean monthly sunshine hours	31.8	64.4	121.9	222.0	248.4	236.4	204.0	183.3	129.8	85.7	47.9	13.5	1,589.1
Percentage possible sunshine	15.4	24.6	33.2	51.2	46.2	42.2	36.4	37.2	33.7	27.6	21.3	7.3	31.4
Source 1: Meteoclimat (temperatures)
Source 2: NOAA-WMO averages 91-2020 Norway

Climate data for Sunndalsøra 1991-2020 (Cfb) (6 m, extremes 1983-2024)
Month	Jan	Feb	Mar	Apr	May	Jun	Jul	Aug	Sep	Oct	Nov	Dec	Year
Record high °C (°F)	19 (66)	18.9 (66.0)	18.4 (65.1)	22.2 (72.0)	30 (86)	31.9 (89.4)	32.1 (89.8)	31.7 (89.1)	27.6 (81.7)	25 (77)	21.6 (70.9)	18.3 (64.9)	32.1 (89.8)
Mean daily maximum °C (°F)	5.1 (41.2)	4.3 (39.7)	6.9 (44.4)	10.7 (51.3)	14.7 (58.5)	17.6 (63.7)	19.9 (67.8)	19.4 (66.9)	16 (61)	10.8 (51.4)	7.5 (45.5)	5.1 (41.2)	11.5 (52.7)
Daily mean °C (°F)	1.6 (34.9)	1.1 (34.0)	2.9 (37.2)	6.6 (43.9)	10.2 (50.4)	13.1 (55.6)	15.5 (59.9)	15.2 (59.4)	12 (54)	7.3 (45.1)	4.3 (39.7)	1.8 (35.2)	7.6 (45.8)
Mean daily minimum °C (°F)	−1.2 (29.8)	−1.6 (29.1)	0.1 (32.2)	3 (37)	6.3 (43.3)	9.4 (48.9)	12 (54)	11.9 (53.4)	8.7 (47.7)	4.4 (39.9)	1.5 (34.7)	−1.1 (30.0)	4.4 (40.0)
Record low °C (°F)	−16.6 (2.1)	−18.9 (−2.0)	−16 (3)	−6.3 (20.7)	−1 (30)	0.7 (33.3)	4 (39)	0.9 (33.6)	−1.5 (29.3)	−7.3 (18.9)	−11.4 (11.5)	−16.7 (1.9)	−18.9 (−2.0)
Average precipitation mm (inches)	92 (3.6)	85 (3.3)	79 (3.1)	59 (2.3)	58 (2.3)	80 (3.1)	73 (2.9)	100 (3.9)	95 (3.7)	93 (3.7)	89 (3.5)	101 (4.0)	1,004 (39.4)
Average precipitation days (≥ 1.0 mm)	13	13	14	11	12	15	14	15	13	12	11	12	155
Source 1: Norwegian Meteorological Institute
Source 2: Noaa WMO averages 91-2020 Norway

Climate data for Røros 1981-2010 (Dfc) (625 m, precipitation days 1961-90, extremes 1900 - 2018)
Month	Jan	Feb	Mar	Apr	May	Jun	Jul	Aug	Sep	Oct	Nov	Dec	Year
Record high °C (°F)	10.4 (50.7)	10.8 (51.4)	14.5 (58.1)	19.0 (66.2)	26.7 (80.1)	29.5 (85.1)	30.7 (87.3)	29.8 (85.6)	25.7 (78.3)	21.2 (70.2)	11.8 (53.2)	7.6 (45.7)	30.7 (87.3)
Mean daily maximum °C (°F)	−4.9 (23.2)	−3.6 (25.5)	0.3 (32.5)	4.8 (40.6)	11 (52)	15.2 (59.4)	18.1 (64.6)	16.4 (61.5)	11.4 (52.5)	5.1 (41.2)	−1 (30)	−4.8 (23.4)	5.7 (42.2)
Daily mean °C (°F)	−9.6 (14.7)	−8.8 (16.2)	−4.8 (23.4)	0.3 (32.5)	5.8 (42.4)	9.9 (49.8)	12.7 (54.9)	11.4 (52.5)	7.1 (44.8)	1.7 (35.1)	−4.5 (23.9)	−9.4 (15.1)	1.0 (33.8)
Mean daily minimum °C (°F)	−14.4 (6.1)	−13.9 (7.0)	−9.9 (14.2)	−4.2 (24.4)	0.6 (33.1)	4.5 (40.1)	7.2 (45.0)	6.4 (43.5)	2.6 (36.7)	−1.8 (28.8)	−8 (18)	−14 (7)	−3.7 (25.3)
Record low °C (°F)	−50.3 (−58.5)	−43.5 (−46.3)	−41.0 (−41.8)	−32.3 (−26.1)	−18.9 (−2.0)	−5.6 (21.9)	−3.4 (25.9)	−4.9 (23.2)	−11.3 (11.7)	−28.4 (−19.1)	−36.4 (−33.5)	−44.0 (−47.2)	−50.3 (−58.5)
Average precipitation mm (inches)	39.3 (1.55)	32 (1.3)	25.9 (1.02)	24.7 (0.97)	33.6 (1.32)	58.6 (2.31)	75.8 (2.98)	74.3 (2.93)	50.8 (2.00)	37.8 (1.49)	36.4 (1.43)	35 (1.4)	524.2 (20.7)
Average precipitation days (≥ 1.0 mm)	9	8	7	7	7	9	12	11	12	10	10	11	113
Source 1: Meteo climat stats
Source 2: met.no/eklima

Climate data for Trondheim Airport Værnes 1991–2020 (Cfb/Dfb) (12 m, extremes 1946–2024, sunhrs 2016–2020)
Month	Jan	Feb	Mar	Apr	May	Jun	Jul	Aug	Sep	Oct	Nov	Dec	Year
Record high °C (°F)	13.7 (56.7)	13.8 (56.8)	15.7 (60.3)	23.3 (73.9)	30 (86)	34.3 (93.7)	34.5 (94.1)	31.3 (88.3)	27.9 (82.2)	22.1 (71.8)	16.1 (61.0)	13.1 (55.6)	34.5 (94.1)
Mean daily maximum °C (°F)	1.9 (35.4)	2.0 (35.6)	4.6 (40.3)	9.3 (48.7)	13.8 (56.8)	17.1 (62.8)	19.8 (67.6)	19.1 (66.4)	15.0 (59.0)	9.3 (48.7)	4.7 (40.5)	2.3 (36.1)	9.9 (49.8)
Daily mean °C (°F)	−1 (30)	−1.1 (30.0)	1 (34)	5.1 (41.2)	9.2 (48.6)	12.6 (54.7)	15.2 (59.4)	14.6 (58.3)	11 (52)	5.8 (42.4)	1.7 (35.1)	−0.7 (30.7)	6.1 (43.0)
Mean daily minimum °C (°F)	−4.1 (24.6)	−4.1 (24.6)	−2.2 (28.0)	1.4 (34.5)	5.3 (41.5)	8.9 (48.0)	11.4 (52.5)	11.0 (51.8)	7.8 (46.0)	2.9 (37.2)	−1.1 (30.0)	−3.9 (25.0)	2.8 (37.0)
Record low °C (°F)	−25.6 (−14.1)	−25.5 (−13.9)	−23.0 (−9.4)	−13.9 (7.0)	−4.7 (23.5)	−0.2 (31.6)	2.3 (36.1)	−0.3 (31.5)	−4.9 (23.2)	−10.8 (12.6)	−19.0 (−2.2)	−23.5 (−10.3)	−25.6 (−14.1)
Average precipitation mm (inches)	64.6 (2.54)	63.9 (2.52)	61.3 (2.41)	42.1 (1.66)	52.7 (2.07)	76.1 (3.00)	74.4 (2.93)	82.8 (3.26)	88.9 (3.50)	77 (3.0)	64.4 (2.54)	75 (3.0)	823.2 (32.43)
Average precipitation days (≥ 1.0 mm)	13	13	13	10	11	13	12	13	13	13	11	14	149
Mean monthly sunshine hours	34	71	124	205	236	234	229	167	130	116	46	16	1,608
Source 1: Seklima
Source 2: NOOA-WMO averages 91-2020 Norway

Climate data for Brønnøysund Airport 1991-2020 (Cfb) (9 m, precipitation 1961-90, extremes 1873-2024 includes earlier stations)
Month	Jan	Feb	Mar	Apr	May	Jun	Jul	Aug	Sep	Oct	Nov	Dec	Year
Record high °C (°F)	10.2 (50.4)	10.9 (51.6)	14.7 (58.5)	21.1 (70.0)	27.8 (82.0)	30.3 (86.5)	32.1 (89.8)	30.1 (86.2)	24.6 (76.3)	20.3 (68.5)	17.6 (63.7)	12.2 (54.0)	32.1 (89.8)
Mean daily maximum °C (°F)	2 (36)	2 (36)	4 (39)	8 (46)	12 (54)	15 (59)	18 (64)	17 (63)	14 (57)	9 (48)	6 (43)	4 (39)	9 (49)
Daily mean °C (°F)	1.1 (34.0)	0.4 (32.7)	1.4 (34.5)	4.7 (40.5)	8.1 (46.6)	11.2 (52.2)	14.3 (57.7)	14 (57)	11.1 (52.0)	6.8 (44.2)	4 (39)	1.9 (35.4)	6.6 (43.8)
Mean daily minimum °C (°F)	0 (32)	−1 (30)	−1 (30)	2 (36)	5 (41)	9 (48)	12 (54)	12 (54)	9 (48)	5 (41)	2 (36)	1 (34)	5 (40)
Record low °C (°F)	−17.1 (1.2)	−18.4 (−1.1)	−15.5 (4.1)	−10.1 (13.8)	−5 (23)	0 (32)	1 (34)	1.1 (34.0)	−4.4 (24.1)	−5.2 (22.6)	−11.3 (11.7)	−18.2 (−0.8)	−18.4 (−1.1)
Average precipitation mm (inches)	138 (5.4)	102 (4.0)	114 (4.5)	97 (3.8)	66 (2.6)	83 (3.3)	123 (4.8)	113 (4.4)	180 (7.1)	192 (7.6)	145 (5.7)	157 (6.2)	1,510 (59.4)
Source 1: yr.no - Meteorologisk Institutt
Source 2: Weatheronline.co.uk

Climate data for Røst 1991-2020 (Csc) (4 m, extremes 1957-2021)
Month	Jan	Feb	Mar	Apr	May	Jun	Jul	Aug	Sep	Oct	Nov	Dec	Year
Record high °C (°F)	10.0 (50.0)	10.4 (50.7)	10.7 (51.3)	14.7 (58.5)	18.9 (66.0)	22.5 (72.5)	23.1 (73.6)	22.2 (72.0)	17.9 (64.2)	15.2 (59.4)	13.5 (56.3)	11.7 (53.1)	23.1 (73.6)
Mean daily maximum °C (°F)	3.6 (38.5)	3.1 (37.6)	3.6 (38.5)	5.6 (42.1)	8.5 (47.3)	11.1 (52.0)	13.8 (56.8)	13.9 (57.0)	11.9 (53.4)	8.6 (47.5)	6.2 (43.2)	4.8 (40.6)	7.9 (46.2)
Daily mean °C (°F)	2.0 (35.6)	1.3 (34.3)	1.8 (35.2)	3.5 (38.3)	6.4 (43.5)	9.1 (48.4)	11.6 (52.9)	11.8 (53.2)	9.9 (49.8)	6.8 (44.2)	4.5 (40.1)	2.7 (36.9)	6.0 (42.8)
Mean daily minimum °C (°F)	−0.3 (31.5)	−0.6 (30.9)	−0.2 (31.6)	1.7 (35.1)	4.5 (40.1)	7.4 (45.3)	9.9 (49.8)	10.2 (50.4)	8.3 (46.9)	5.1 (41.2)	2.6 (36.7)	1.0 (33.8)	4.2 (39.6)
Record low °C (°F)	−12.4 (9.7)	−12.1 (10.2)	−8.4 (16.9)	−6.2 (20.8)	−2.6 (27.3)	−0.1 (31.8)	5.6 (42.1)	3.9 (39.0)	0.0 (32.0)	−4.0 (24.8)	−6.1 (21.0)	−8.4 (16.9)	−12.4 (9.7)
Average precipitation mm (inches)	126.0 (4.96)	84.6 (3.33)	68.0 (2.68)	44.5 (1.75)	42.8 (1.69)	36.8 (1.45)	48.8 (1.92)	61.8 (2.43)	75.9 (2.99)	88.7 (3.49)	98.3 (3.87)	97.7 (3.85)	873.9 (34.41)
Source: Norwegian Centre for Climate Services

Climate data for Tromsø 1991-2020 (Dfc, Cfc at Tromsø-Holt) (100 m, extremes 1920-2022)
Month	Jan	Feb	Mar	Apr	May	Jun	Jul	Aug	Sep	Oct	Nov	Dec	Year
Record high °C (°F)	8.4 (47.1)	8.2 (46.8)	9.7 (49.5)	17 (63)	26.6 (79.9)	29.9 (85.8)	30.2 (86.4)	28.4 (83.1)	22.4 (72.3)	18.6 (65.5)	11.9 (53.4)	9.7 (49.5)	30.2 (86.4)
Mean daily maximum °C (°F)	−1 (30)	−1.2 (29.8)	0.6 (33.1)	4.1 (39.4)	8.8 (47.8)	13 (55)	16.3 (61.3)	15 (59)	10.9 (51.6)	5.2 (41.4)	2.1 (35.8)	0.3 (32.5)	6.2 (43.1)
Daily mean °C (°F)	−3 (27)	−3.3 (26.1)	−1.9 (28.6)	1.2 (34.2)	5.5 (41.9)	9.4 (48.9)	12.3 (54.1)	11.3 (52.3)	7.8 (46.0)	3.1 (37.6)	0.2 (32.4)	−1.7 (28.9)	3.4 (38.2)
Mean daily minimum °C (°F)	−5.3 (22.5)	−5.6 (21.9)	−4.4 (24.1)	−1.6 (29.1)	2.4 (36.3)	6.2 (43.2)	9 (48)	8.3 (46.9)	5.3 (41.5)	0.9 (33.6)	−1.9 (28.6)	−3.9 (25.0)	0.8 (33.4)
Record low °C (°F)	−18.3 (−0.9)	−18.4 (−1.1)	−17.0 (1.4)	−14.3 (6.3)	−6.6 (20.1)	−2.5 (27.5)	0.7 (33.3)	1.1 (34.0)	−4.3 (24.3)	−9.6 (14.7)	−14.2 (6.4)	−16.8 (1.8)	−18.4 (−1.1)
Average precipitation mm (inches)	108.3 (4.26)	96.7 (3.81)	96.7 (3.81)	71.1 (2.80)	56.5 (2.22)	58 (2.3)	72.5 (2.85)	88 (3.5)	111.3 (4.38)	127.4 (5.02)	94.4 (3.72)	109.7 (4.32)	1,090.6 (42.99)
Average precipitation days (≥ 1 mm)	15.4	12.9	11.4	11.6	11.1	10.3	12.8	12.6	14.9	17.7	13.5	15.6	160.1
Mean monthly sunshine hours	3	36	111	171	215	239	226	164	96	55	8	0	1,324
Average ultraviolet index	0	0	1	2	3	3	3	2	1	0	0	0	1
Source 1: Met Norway, The Weather Network, Meteostat.net
Source 2: Weather Atlas (UV index)

Climate data for Lakselv Airport, Banak in Porsanger 1991-2020 (Dfc) (5 m, extremes 1979-2024)
Month	Jan	Feb	Mar	Apr	May	Jun	Jul	Aug	Sep	Oct	Nov	Dec	Year
Record high °C (°F)	9.4 (48.9)	9.4 (48.9)	13 (55)	15.9 (60.6)	28.2 (82.8)	32.5 (90.5)	34.3 (93.7)	32.8 (91.0)	25 (77)	15.1 (59.2)	11.9 (53.4)	10.1 (50.2)	34.3 (93.7)
Mean daily maximum °C (°F)	−4.2 (24.4)	−4.5 (23.9)	−0.9 (30.4)	3.6 (38.5)	9 (48)	13.7 (56.7)	17.4 (63.3)	15.8 (60.4)	11.4 (52.5)	4.5 (40.1)	−0.4 (31.3)	−2.2 (28.0)	5.3 (41.5)
Daily mean °C (°F)	−7.9 (17.8)	−7.9 (17.8)	−4.5 (23.9)	0.1 (32.2)	5.3 (41.5)	9.6 (49.3)	12.9 (55.2)	11.6 (52.9)	7.8 (46.0)	1.9 (35.4)	−3.4 (25.9)	−5.7 (21.7)	1.7 (35.0)
Mean daily minimum °C (°F)	−11.8 (10.8)	−11.8 (10.8)	−8.5 (16.7)	−3.7 (25.3)	1.6 (34.9)	6.1 (43.0)	9.2 (48.6)	7.8 (46.0)	4.5 (40.1)	−0.8 (30.6)	−6.5 (20.3)	−9.2 (15.4)	−1.9 (28.5)
Record low °C (°F)	−33.6 (−28.5)	−33 (−27)	−29.9 (−21.8)	−24.7 (−12.5)	−11.4 (11.5)	−1.6 (29.1)	−0.2 (31.6)	−3.1 (26.4)	−9.2 (15.4)	−21.2 (−6.2)	−26.4 (−15.5)	−30 (−22)	−33.6 (−28.5)
Average precipitation mm (inches)	24.7 (0.97)	18.5 (0.73)	19.9 (0.78)	17.1 (0.67)	25.5 (1.00)	42.5 (1.67)	57.2 (2.25)	54.3 (2.14)	37.7 (1.48)	33.4 (1.31)	23.6 (0.93)	27.5 (1.08)	381.9 (15.01)
Average precipitation days (≥ 1.0 mm)	12	11	12	13	14	15	17	16	15	15	12	14	166
Source 1: yr.no/Norwegian Meteorological Institute
Source 2: NOAA WMO averages 91-2020 Norway

Climate data for Svalbard Airport Longyearbyen 1991-2020 (Et) (28 m, extremes 1975-2022)
Month	Jan	Feb	Mar	Apr	May	Jun	Jul	Aug	Sep	Oct	Nov	Dec	Year
Record high °C (°F)	7.7 (45.9)	7 (45)	6.3 (43.3)	7.5 (45.5)	12.9 (55.2)	15.7 (60.3)	21.7 (71.1)	20.3 (68.5)	15.2 (59.4)	10.1 (50.2)	9.2 (48.6)	8.7 (47.7)	21.7 (71.1)
Mean daily maximum °C (°F)	−7.7 (18.1)	−8.3 (17.1)	−8.8 (16.2)	−5.7 (21.7)	−0.6 (30.9)	5.6 (42.1)	9.4 (48.9)	8.2 (46.8)	4 (39)	−1.5 (29.3)	−3.8 (25.2)	−6.1 (21.0)	−1.3 (29.7)
Daily mean °C (°F)	−10.9 (12.4)	−11.6 (11.1)	−12 (10)	−8.8 (16.2)	−2.2 (28.0)	3.6 (38.5)	7 (45)	6 (43)	2 (36)	−3.8 (25.2)	−6.4 (20.5)	−9.2 (15.4)	−3.9 (25.1)
Mean daily minimum °C (°F)	−14.2 (6.4)	−15 (5)	−15.5 (4.1)	−12.1 (10.2)	−3.9 (25.0)	2.2 (36.0)	5.4 (41.7)	4.4 (39.9)	0.3 (32.5)	−6.1 (21.0)	−9.3 (15.3)	−12.2 (10.0)	−6.3 (20.6)
Record low °C (°F)	−38.8 (−37.8)	−43.7 (−46.7)	−46.3 (−51.3)	−39.1 (−38.4)	−21.7 (−7.1)	−8.4 (16.9)	−0.7 (30.7)	−3.9 (25.0)	−12.6 (9.3)	−20.8 (−5.4)	−33.2 (−27.8)	−35.6 (−32.1)	−46.3 (−51.3)
Average precipitation mm (inches)	21 (0.8)	17 (0.7)	16 (0.6)	9 (0.4)	8 (0.3)	8 (0.3)	20 (0.8)	23 (0.9)	26 (1.0)	18 (0.7)	22 (0.9)	24 (0.9)	212 (8.3)
Source 1: Norwegian Meteorological Institute
Source 2: Meteostat

== Climate change ==
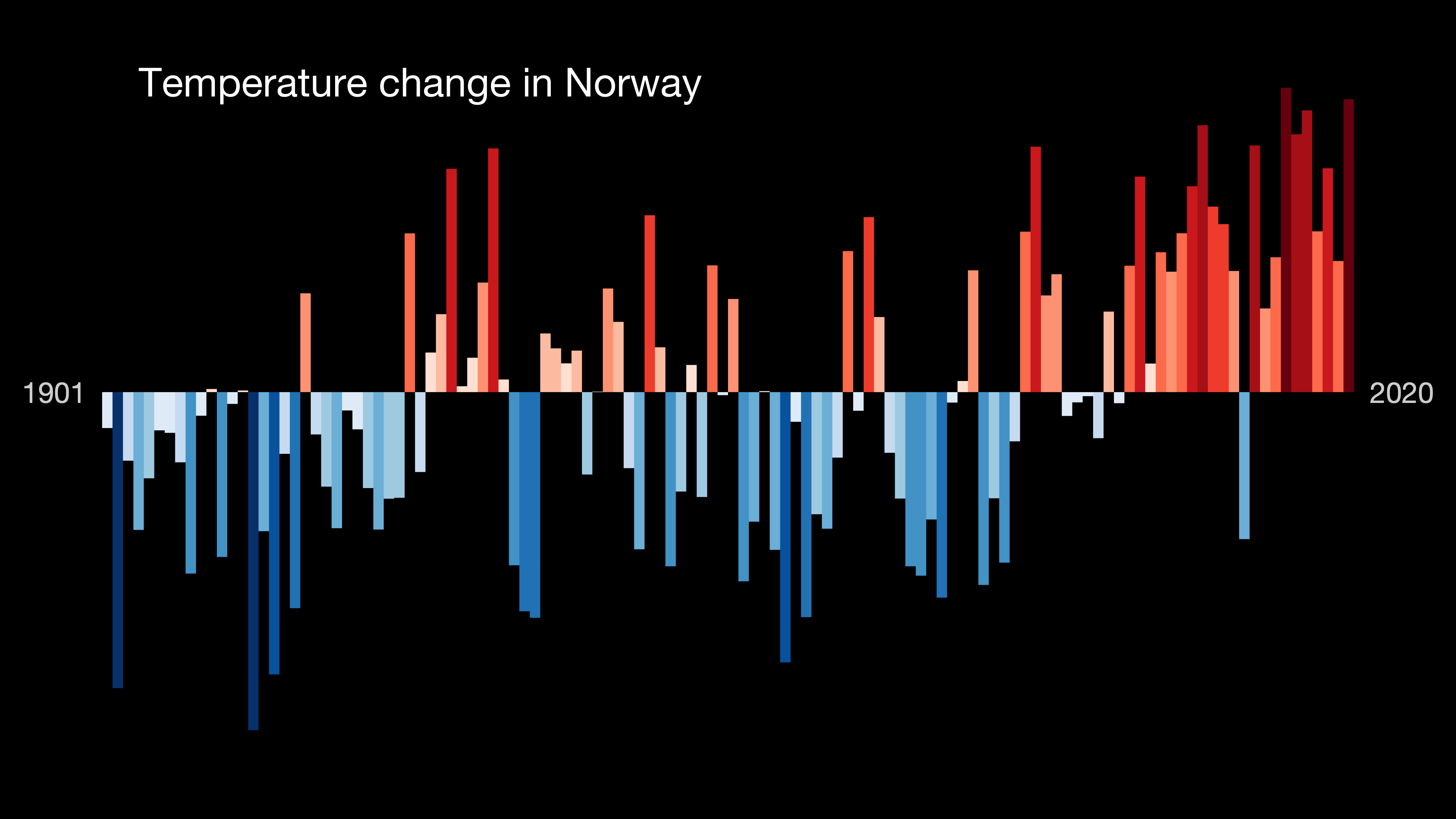
Visualisation of average annual temperature anomaly in Norway, 1901 to 2020.

All regions and seasons of Norway are expected to become warmer and wetter due to climate change.

On a per-capita basis, Norway is the world's largest producer, and exporter, of oil and natural gas outside the Middle East. In 2016, 56 new licenses for oil exploration near the Lofoten Islands were issued. However, 98% of Norway's electricity demand is supplied by renewable sources, mostly from hydroelectric power, generated using Norway's extensive freshwater reserves. Emissions are also generated through transportation, although Norway is a world leader in electric vehicles.

Warmer temperatures in Norway are causing permafrost and glaciers to retreat, and leading to shifts in precipitation patterns. Climate change is particularly impacting Norway's Arctic region. Biodiversity and forested areas are experiencing shifts due to the phenomenon, with significant implications for the agriculture and economy of the country. Indigenous Sámi people's practices are being impacted by climate change.

Norway's government have introduced several social and economic policies towards climate change mitigation, including through carbon capture and storage. Norway wants to achieve carbon neutrality by 2030, partly by investing in projects with emissions reduction abroad. It wants to achieve zero emission in the country by 2050. In 2020, Norway pledged to achieve a 50% - 55% reduction in domestic emissions from the level of 1990 by 2030.

== See also ==
- Climate
- Geography of Norway
