= BritNed =

Electrical interconnector between the UK and the Netherlands

- Location of BritNed

Location
- Country: United Kingdom, Netherlands
- Coordinates: 51°26′24″N 0°43′0″E; 51°57′27″N 4°01′17″E
- General direction: north–south, west–south
- From: Isle of Grain, Kent
- Passes through: North Sea
- To: Maasvlakte, Rotterdam

Ownership information
- Partners: National Grid plc (United Kingdom); TenneT (Netherlands)

Construction information
- Cable manufacturer: ABB
- Cable layer: Global Marine Systems
- Substation manufacturer: Siemens
- Substation installer: BAM Nuttall
- Construction started: 2009
- Commissioned: 2011

Technical information
- Type: submarine cable
- Current type: HVDC
- Total length: 260 km (160 mi)
- Capacity: 1,000 MW
- DC voltage: 450 kV
- No. of poles: 2

BritNed is a 1,000 MW high-voltage direct-current (HVDC) submarine power cable between the Isle of Grain in Kent, the United Kingdom; and Maasvlakte in Rotterdam, the Netherlands.

The BritNed interconnector would serve as a link for the foreseeable European super grid project.

== History ==
Existing links Under construction Proposed See also the List of HVDC project in Europe, which would eventually be part of European Supergrid

The project was announced in May 2007. The installation of the first section of cable link started on 11 September 2009, The entire 260 km (160 miles) cable was completed in October 2010. It began operation on 1 April 2011, and as of January 2012, electricity flow has mostly been from the Netherlands to the UK.

== Technical description ==
The 260 km (160-mile) long bi-pole 450 kV interconnector consists of two HVDC cables, which are bundled together. The capacity of the cable is 1,000 MW. The interconnector has two converter stations for connecting the link with the British and Dutch high-voltage electricity transmission systems. The cable was produced by ABB and laid by Global Marine Systems, while the BAM Nuttall/Siemens consortium was responsible for the construction and equipping of the converter stations. BritNed was completed on time and within the budget of €600 million.

== Operators ==
The respective transmission system operators of the United Kingdom and the Netherlands - National Grid plc and TenneT; formed a joint venture to fund and operate the interconnection, independently from National Grid and TenneT's regulated businesses.

== Outages ==
BritNed suffered a number of outages due to undersea cable faults in 2020/21. A significant outage happened on 9 March 2021 and the connection was scheduled to be restored on 8 May 2021, but this was later delayed until 7 June 2021.

== Coordinates ==
Site	Coordinates
Grain Static Inverter Plant	51°26′24″N 0°43′0″E
Maasvlakte Static Inverter Plant	51°57′27″N 4°01′17″E

== See also ==
- NorNed
- Gridlink Interconnector
- HVDC Cross-Channel, 2,000 MW between UK and France
- Icelink, a proposed link between Iceland and Great Britain
- Nemo Link, 1,000 MW between UK and Belgium
- HVDC Norway–UK, 1,400 MW between UK and Norway
- List of HVDC projects in Europe
- Renewable energy in the United Kingdom
- Renewable energy in the Netherlands
