= List of high-voltage transmission links in Norway =

Norway has several high-voltage transmission links.

== International links ==
Name	Substation NO	Substation 2	Length (km)	Voltage (kV)	Power (MW)	Operational	Remarks
Boris Gleb	Kirkenes	(Russia) Boris Gleb	10.7	154	50	1972	import only from Boris Gleb hydroelectric station
Skagerrak	Kristiansand	(Denmark) Tjele	240	2 × 250, 1 × 350, 1 × 500	1,632	1977	submarine HVDC, 4 subsystems
NorNed	Feda	(Netherlands) Eemshaven	580	±450	700	2008	submarine HVDC
NordLink	Ertsmyra	(Germany) Wilster	623	500	1,400	2021	submarine HVDC
North Sea Link	Kvilldal	(United Kingdom) Blyth, Northumberland	720	±515	1,400	2021	submarine HVDC

In addition to the above, named interconnectors Norway has cross-border interconnections with Sweden and Finland, as of 2022 seven 132 kV–420 kV lines to Sweden and one 220 kV AC line to Finland. As of October 2022 Norway can in total import 9,245 MW of power and export 8,950 MW of power.

== National links ==
Name	Substation 1	Substation 2	Length (km)	Voltage (kV)	Power (MW)	Operational	Remarks
HVDC Troll	Kollsnes	Troll A platform	70	60	80	2004	unidirectional, submarine HVDC
Valhall HVDC	Lista	Valhall oil field	292	150	78	2011	unidirectional, submarine HVDC
Johan Sverdrup Phase 1	Haugsneset	Johan Sverdrup platform	200	±80	100	2019	unidirectional, submarine HVDC
Johan Sverdrup Phase 2	Haugsneset	Johan Sverdrup platform	200	±80	200	2019	unidirectional, submarine HVDC

== See also ==
- Electricity sector in Norway
- List of power stations in Norway
- Nordic energy market
- List of high-voltage transmission links in Sweden
- List of high-voltage transmission links in the United Kingdom
