= NorNed =

Power cable between Norway and the Netherlands

- Location of NorNed

Location
- Country: Norway, Netherlands
- Coordinates: 53°26′4″N 6°51′57″E; 58°16′58″N 6°51′55″E
- General direction: north–south
- From: Feda, Norway
- Passes through: North Sea
- To: Eemshaven, Netherlands

Ownership information
- Partners: Statnett, TenneT

Construction information
- Cable manufacturer: Nexans, ABB
- Construction started: 2006
- Commissioned: 2008

Technical information
- Type: submarine cable
- Current type: HVDC
- Total length: 580 km (360 mi)
- Capacity: 700 MW
- AC voltage: 300 kV (Feda), 400 kV (Eemshaven)
- DC voltage: ±450 kV
- No. of poles: 1

NorNed is a 580-kilometre (360 mi) long high-voltage direct current submarine power cable between Feda, Norway and the seaport of Eemshaven in the Netherlands, which interconnects both countries' electrical grids. It was once the longest submarine power cable in the world. Budgeted at €550 million, and completed at a cost of €600m, the NorNed cable is a bipolar HVDC link with a voltage of ±450 kV and a capacity of 700 MW. NorNed is a joint project of the Norwegian transmission system operator Statnett and its Dutch counterpart TenneT. The cable system itself and the two converter stations were produced by ABB.

== History ==
Installation of the first sections started in early 2006 and the final section was laid by the end of 2007. On the Dutch shore, TenneT has connected the cable to the 380 kV Dutch high‑voltage grid. In Feda, Statnett has done the same for the 300 kV Norwegian transmission grid. Commercial operation started on 5 May 2008 with a capacity auction. The first commercial power transfer took place on 6 May 2008.

After two months of operation, the cable generated revenues of approximately €50 million. In the business case drawn up for the NorNed cable, annual revenues were estimated at €64 million.

NorNed has been included in European Market Coupling Company operations as of 12 January 2011. The internal grid in Norway is sometimes not capable of handling enough power for NorNed and Cross-Skagerrak, and capacity for these cables is then artificially limited.

The cable had a fault in 2011, causing 7 weeks out of operation.

A fault was discovered in May 2022, causing a shutdown of operations. Operations are expected to resume in October 2022.

== Technology ==
Although classed as a "bipolar" HVDC scheme, the NorNed scheme is unusual for a Line-Commutated (thyristor-based) HVDC scheme since there is just one 12-pulse converter at each end of the scheme, midpoint-grounded at Eemshaven. With voltage-source converter-based HVDC systems, this arrangement with the two high voltage cables at equal and opposite voltages but only a single converter at each end is referred to as a Symmetrical monopole.

Consequently, with a DC voltage of ±450 kV, the converter for the NorNed project has a terminal to terminal DC voltage rating of 900 kV, making it (as of 2012) the highest voltage rating of any HVDC converter in the world. The connection has a loss of 4.2% (95.8% efficiency).

== Sites ==
Site	Coordinates
Eemshaven Converter Station	53°26′4″N 6°51′57″E
Feda Converter Station	58°16′58″N 6°51′55″E

== Trading mechanism ==
NorNed is the first power link between the Nordic electrical transmission system Nordel and the continent that is planned to be open to the power market. The main trading over the link is presumed to be one day ahead spot market trading based on the price difference between the markets. In spite of quite equal average spot market prices, the hour-by-hour differences are quite significant most of the time. The way the power exchanges will be compensated was to be agreed, and the direct net income from the trade is to be shared 50/50 between TenneT and Statnett.

== See also ==
- Dutch cables: BritNed, COBRAcable
- List of high-voltage transmission links in Norway
- Proposed: NorGer, Scotland-Norway interconnector
- Others: Basslink - second longest submarine power cable.
- Renewable energy in Norway
- Renewable energy in the Netherlands
