= Renewable energy in Norway =

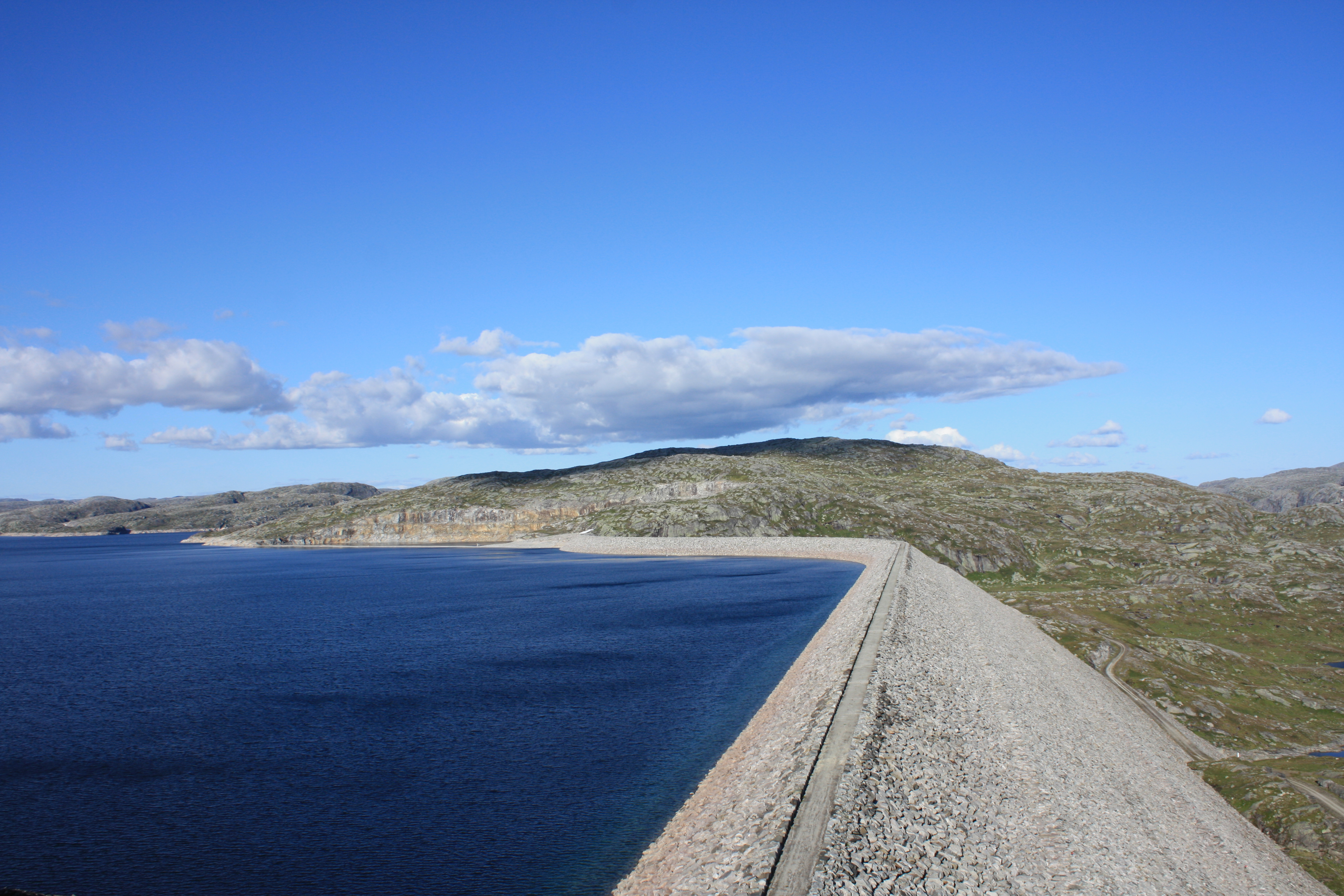
The Ulla-Førre hydropower complex has an installed capacity of approximately 2,100 MW

Norway is a heavy producer of renewable energy because of hydropower. Around 88% of electricity production in Norway is from 1971 hydropower plants with a combined production capacity of over 40 GW (87 TWh reservoir capacity, storing water from summer to winter). Normal annual hydropower energy production is around 157 TWh. (Up from 135.3 TWh in 2007). There is also a large potential in wind power, offshore wind power and wave power, as well as production of bio-energy from wood. Norway has limited resources in solar energy, but is one of the world's largest producers of solar grade silicon and silicon solar cells.

Total renewable energy capacity 2014–2023 (MW)
2014	2015	2016	2017	2018	2019	2020	2021	2022	2023
32,252	32,394	32,814	33,251	34,396	35,912	37,999	39,406	39,766	40,161

== Green certificates ==
The system for Guarantees of Origin was implemented by the EU Renewable Energy Directive 2009/28/EC, trading 'green certificates', the sale of which in 2010 relabeled the calculated average electricity consumption mix of a Norwegian household down from the actual 99% to 36% renewable.

== Hydroelectric power ==
External image
- Diagram of Reservoir content for Norway

Norway is Europe's largest producer of hydropower and the 6th largest in the world. 90% of capacity is publicly owned. The largest producer is the Norwegian government, through the state-owned Statkraft which in turn, owns nine of the largest hydroelectric plants and is also a major player in the international energy markets. Electricity is also produced by a number of other state-owned and privately held companies. Hydropower generation capacity was around 31 GW in 2014 and 2019, when around 132 TWh was produced; about 95% of total production. Large reservoirs (87 TWh combined capacity) are necessary due to precipitation being significantly lower in winter when consumption is highest, while meltwater rushes to the reservoirs in summer when consumption is at its lowest. When reservoirs are full, additional water must be passed through spillways in a controlled manner to avoid damage. The largest reservoir is Blåsjø at 7.8 TWh.

Hydropower energy capacity 2014–2023 (MW)
2014	2015	2016	2017	2018	2019	2020	2021	2022	2023
31,240	31,372	31,817	31,912	32,530	32,797	33,732	34,075	34,269	34,401

The remaining undeveloped hydro potential is about 34 TWh. By 2010 70% of the total potential had already been developed, one of the highest ratios in the world. Dam safety reassessment began in 1995 and by 2014, 26% of existing installations have been rehabilitated or upgraded. Generating capacity in Norway is growing, between 2001 and 2014 there were 397 new projects commissioned, larger than 1 MW. Upgrades to older installations larger than 10 MW represents 70% of all new capacity. Electricity trading with wind power generated in the Netherlands, Germany and Denmark is driving modifications to the Norwegian hydro system.

== Wind power ==
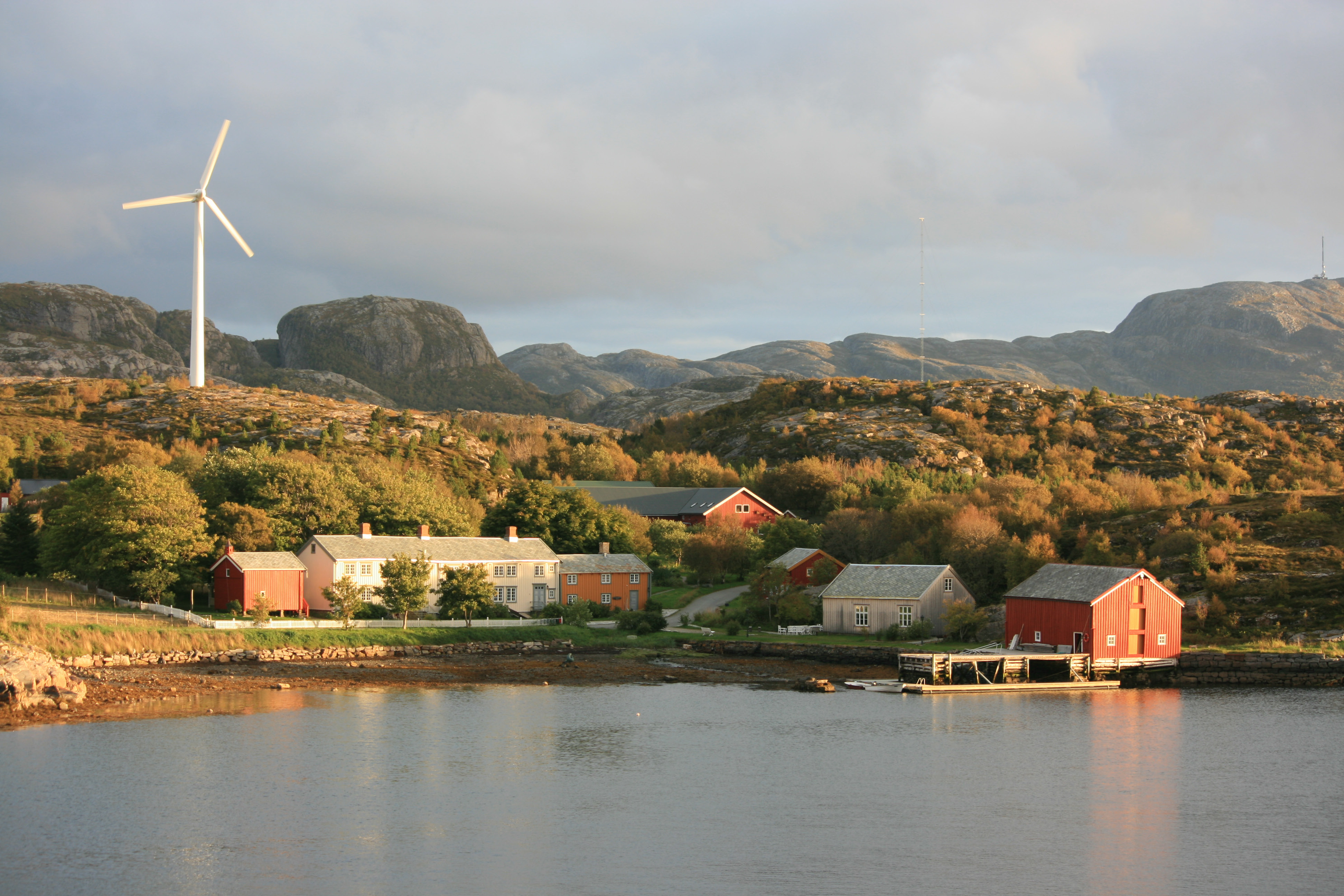
Wind turbine in Ørland Municipality

In 2012 Norway had a wind power electricity production of 1.6 terawatt-hours (5.8 PJ), a small fraction of its total production. The following year it approved spending 20 billion NOK to triple its wind power capacity of ca. 700 MW to more than 2 GW by 2020. In August 2016 construction of the 1 GW Fosen Vind project began. New projects increased capacity to 2.4 GW and production to 5.5 TWh in 2019. Increased production of power from wind turbines can allow Norway to curtail its domestic production of hydroelectricity (stopping hydro turbines), which due to being dispatchable is a valuable asset in the international power market. To further curtail its consumption of hydroelectricity, Norway imports electricity when excess wind production in Denmark, Germany and the Netherlands drives prices down there. Subsequently similar transmission lines with Scotland and Germany (North Sea Link and the NORD.LINK) came online in 2021. A public hearing in 2019 for further land-based turbine developments received over a thousand responses, the majority of which were negative.

Wind energy capacity 2014–2023 (MW)
2014	2015	2016	2017	2018	2019	2020	2021	2022	2023
859	867	883	1,207	1,710	2,914	4,030	5,049	5,062	5,065

The Norwegian Water Resources and Energy Directorate reported that, as of the beginning of 2023, Norway had 1,392 operational wind turbines distributed across 65 wind farms, with a total annual production of 16,923 GWh (11% of Norway's electricity generation).

Construction of two wind facilities in the Fosen peninsula, totaling 151 turbines, was opposed by some Sámi activists in 2023. The project went forward after an agreement was reached (after nearly a year of negotiations), under which the turbines would continue to produce power beyond 2040. In mid-2023, the government postponed a plan to impose a 40% resource rent tax on onshore wind generation after an outcry from the renewable-energy industry. In December 2023, an agreement on the tax was reached in the Storting (Norwegian parliament), setting the resource rent tax on onshore wind energy at 25%, effective January 1, 2024.

== Transport ==
In the transport sector the share of renewables has increased from 1.3% to 4% between 2005 and 2010, and currently Norway has one of the highest numbers of electric cars per capita in the world. The government's initial goal of 50,000 electric cars on Norwegian roads was reached on 20 April 2015, more than two years earlier than expected. By reaching a stock of 50,000 electric cars, the market penetration of pure electric vehicles achieved 2% of all passenger cars registered in Norway. The segment's penetration passed 3% in December 2015. With about 90,000 pure electric vehicles registered by mid-September 2016, the all-electric segment achieved a market penetration of 3.5% of all light-duty vehicles on Norway's roads.

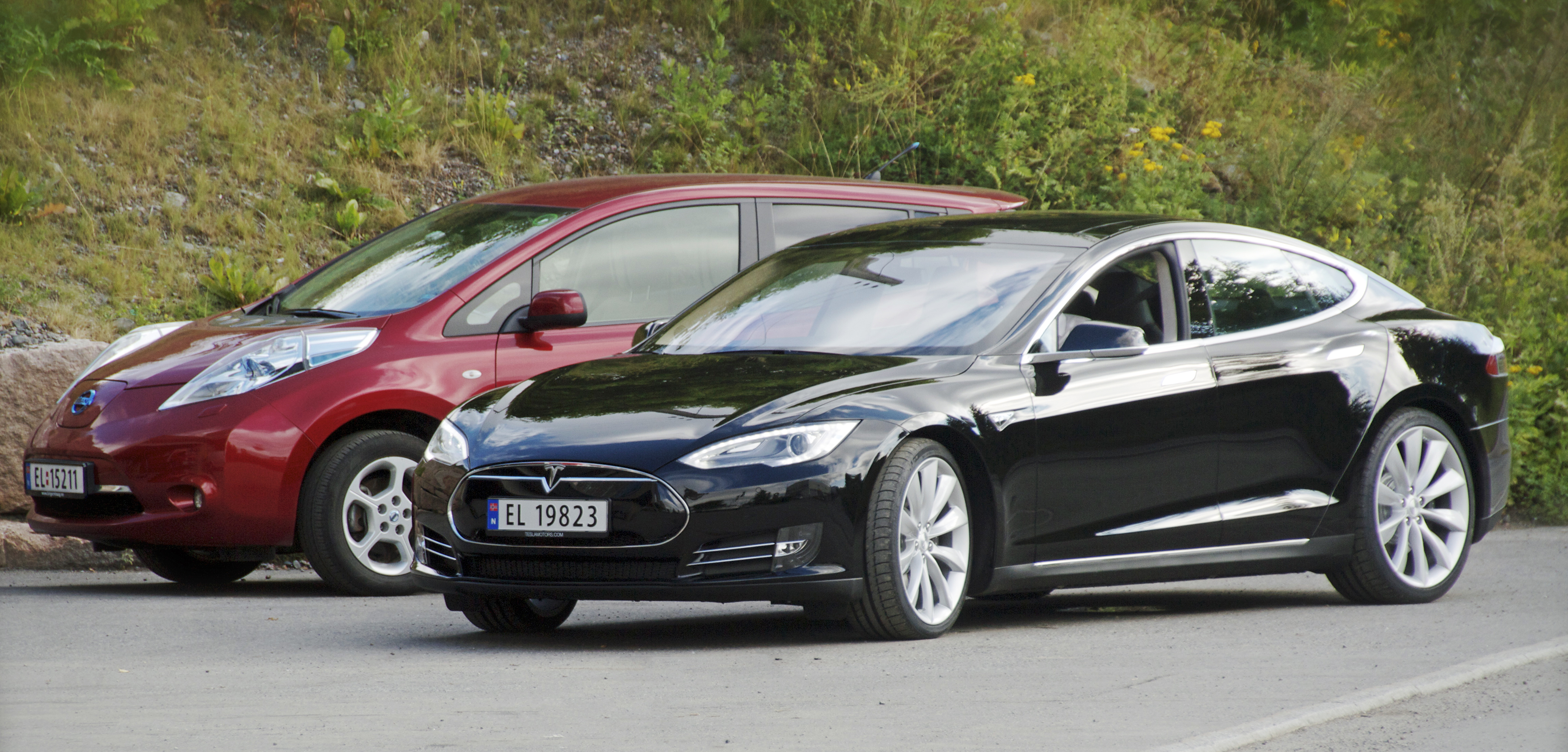
The all-electric Nissan Leaf (left) and the Tesla Model S (right) were the two best selling plug-in electric cars in Norway in 2014.

The stock of light-duty plug-in electric vehicles registered in Norway passed the 100,000 unit milestone in April 2016, making the country the fourth largest plug-in market in the world after the U.S., China and Japan. As of April 2016, the Norwegian fleet of plug-in electric vehicles consist of about 81,500 all-electric passenger and light-duty vehicles, almost 17,100 plug-in hybrids, and over 2,000 all-electric commercial vans. The total stock includes almost 12,000 used imported electric cars.

In February 2016, the government opened for public discussion until 1 July 2016 the proposed National Transport Plan 2018-2029 (NTP). The plan explains that the transportation sector accounts for emissions of about 16.5 million tons of CO_{2}, which is about one third of the total greenhouse gas emissions produced domestically in Norway. And road traffic, including both private cars and heavy vehicles, account for about 10 million tons of CO_{2}. The NTP set policies and actions to reduce greenhouse gas emissions from private cars, trucks, ships, aircraft and construction equipment by about one half until 2030.

In order to achieve this objective, among others, the NTP sets the goal that all new cars, buses and light commercial vehicles in 2025 should be zero emission vehicles, that is, all-electric and hydrogen vehicles. By 2030, heavy-duty vans, 75% of new long-distance buses, and 50% of new trucks must be zero emission vehicles. Also, by 2030, 40% of all ships in short sea shipping should be using biofuels or be low- or zero-emission ships such as electric ferries. The proposed strategy states that until zero-emission vehicles take over, all internal combustion engine cars sold be plug-in hybrids, and wherever possible, biofuels must be used. Also, government agencies should as far as possible make use of biofuels, low- and zero-emission technologies in private and hired vehicles and vessels. The plan also calls to support the deployment of zero emission vehicles, but also for the reduction of the existing incentives, and proposes to invest more in public transport, walking and cycling.

== See also ==
- Energy in Norway
- Centre for Renewable Energy
- Electricity sector in Norway
- Scotland-Norway interconnector
- Renewable energy in Sweden
- Renewable energy in Finland
- Renewable energy in Denmark
- Renewable energy in Iceland
- Renewable energy by country
