= Å Energi =

Norwegian energy company

- Company type: Private
- Industry: Power
- Founded: April 14, 2000; 26 years ago
- Headquarters: Kristiansand, Norway
- Area served: Agder
- Key people: Steffen Syvertsen (CEO); Maria Moræus Hanssen (chair)
- Products: Electricity; District heating
- Owner: Statkraft (45.5%); 30 municipalities
- Number of employees: 241 (2026)
- Website: aenergi.no/en

Å Energi (formerly Agder Energi) is a Norwegian energy group involved in hydroelectric power generation, electricity distribution, electricity trading and services for customers in the business and consumer markets. The Group operates in Norway, Scandinavia and the rest of Europe, and focuses on developing hydroelectric power in Norway and investing in new trading solutions for the decentralised European energy market.

The group has 83 wholly and partly owned hydropower plants, with a total annual production of 13 TWh.

The majority shareholders are the thirty municipalities in the counties of Vest Agder and Aust Agder, who have a combined ownership interest of 54.475 percent. Statkraft Holding AS owns the remaining 45.525 percent of the shares.

== Subsidiaries ==
- Entelios
- Vibb
- Glitre Nett
- Å Energi Vannkraft

== See also ==
- Scotland-Norway interconnector
