= Resource rent tax =

Tax on surplus value of resource exploitation

A resource rent tax is a tax on the rents gained on the exploitation of a resource. It can cover both renewable and non-renewable resources. It is classically understood to be a tax on the surplus value generated by resource exploitation beyond the necessary costs of production (which includes rewards to capital). An investor enjoys relief from taxation until a certain rate of return has been achieved, at which point profits are shared with the host government.

Resource rent taxes are particularly prevalent in the mining and petroleum industries. Australia's Minerals Resource Rent Tax covers rents in the mining industry. Norway introduced a resource rent tax on aquaculture (i.e., salmon and trout farming) in 2023, and resource rent tax on onshore wind energy effective January 1, 2024. In Iceland, a resource rent tax has been placed on fishing industry profits. In Switzerland, there is a resource rent tax on hydropower.

Some other countries that apply resource rent tax include:

- Australia
- United Kingdom
- Canada
- Russia
- Azerbaijan
- Madagascar
- Ghana

== See also ==
- Georgism
- Land value tax
- Mineral tax
