= NorGer =

Proposed electricity link between Germany and Norway

Location
- Country: Norway; Germany
- General direction: north–south
- From: Tonstad, Norway
- Passes through: Flekkefjord, North Sea
- To: Wilhelmshaven, Germany

Ownership information
- Owner: NorGer KS
- Partners: Statnett; Agder Energi; Lyse Energi; EGL

Technical information
- Type: submarine cable
- Current type: HVDC
- Total length: 570 km (350 mi)
- Capacity: 1,400 MW
- DC voltage: 450–500 kV

NorGer was one of two planned electricity cables between Germany and Norway. The other proposed project was NordLink, which Statnett decided to proceed with in 2015, and NorGer was cancelled.

== Description ==
NorGer interconnector will start in Tonstad in Norway. From Tonstad 70-kilometre (43 mi) overhead powerline runs to the Flekkefjord area. From Flekkefjord a 570-kilometre (350 mi) long high voltage direct current submarine cable will run through the North Sea to Mooriem in Lower Saxony, Germany. It will be laid on the Norwegian, German and Danish Continental Shelf. The precise cable route is decided from a thorough mapping of the sea-bed along the prospective cable route. The sea route is consulted by Offshore Marine Management.

NorGer will have a transmission capacity of 1,400 megawatts (1,900,000 hp) and an operating voltage of 450–500 kV. The price per kWh could rise by 0.8 øre in Norway. The sea cable is planned as a bipolar system with earthing through the return cable. This way, the disadvantages of a ground-return electrode with earthing in the sea, such as production of chlorine compounds and metal corrosion, are avoided. Anticipated life span of the cable would be about 40 years. Since the power supply in both Germany and Norway is based on alternating current, converter stations must be built in both countries.

== Project company ==
The project is developed by NorGer KS, a company that is owned by the Norwegian transmission system operator Statnett, energy utilities Agder Energi and Lyse Produksjon, and the Swiss company Elektrizitäts-Gesellschaft Laufenburg. NorGer is registered in Norway. Statnett owns 50% of the projects while all other partners own stake of 16.67% each.

== Environment ==
NorGer will use the best available technology to limit the cable’s impact on the environment. Previous investigations show that underwater HVDC cables have no known impact on sea life.

== Climate gain ==
In periods of overproduction, German wind power can be transported to Norway while water in Norwegian reservoirs can be stored for later use. With limited access to pumped hydro power stations in Southern Germany it is difficult to use the increase in wind power in the North German coastal areas. The cable connection would also be important for Norway’s plans to use more wind power.

Power supply from wind power varies from hour to hour according to wind strength and access to reserve power is often needed to meet variable demand. Hydroelectric power, with its regulatory capacity is a cheap and reliable balancing power source for wind power.

== See also ==
- HVDC Norway–UK
- Scotland-Norway interconnector
