= HVDC Troll =

HVDC transmission line in Norway

- Map of HVDC Troll

Location
- Country: Norway
- Coordinates: 60°33′01″N 4°50′26″E; 60°40′00″N 3°40′00″E
- From: Kollsnes Static Inverter Plant
- Passes through: North Sea
- To: Troll A platform

Ownership information
- Owner: Equinor

Construction information
- Cable manufacturer: ABB
- Expected: 2015 (3rd and 4th line)
- Commissioned: 2005 (1st and 2nd line)

Technical information
- Type: Submarine power cable
- Current type: HVDC
- Total length: 68 km (42 mi)
- Capacity: 84 MW; 184 MW (after 2015)
- AC voltage: 132 kV (Kollsnes); 56 kV (Troll)
- DC voltage: ±60 kV
- No. of poles: 2
- No. of circuits: 2

The HVDC Troll is a bipolar high-voltage direct current (HVDC) electric power transmission line for the supply of the gas compressor station on the offshore construction work Troll A platform. It consists of dual set of a 68-kilometre (42 mi) long bipolar submarine cable designed for ±60 kV between the inverter at the Troll A platform and the static rectifier station at Kollsnes in Norway. The HVDC Troll has a maximum transmission rate of 84 megawatt.

In 2013 work started on a new rectifier station at Kollsnes for supplying the two new compressors being installed on Troll A.

== Sites ==
Site	Coordinates
Kollsnes Static Inverter Plant	60°33′01″N 4°50′26″E
Offshore platform Troll A	60°40′00″N 3°40′00″E

== See also ==
- List of high-voltage transmission links in Norway
