= NorthConnect =

Proposed electrical transmission system under the North Sea

Location
- Country: Norway; United Kingdom (Scotland)
- From: Samnanger Municipality, Norway
- Passes through: North Sea
- To: Peterhead, Aberdeenshire, Scotland (preliminary)

Ownership information
- Owner: NorthConnect
- Partners: Agder Energi, Norway; E-CO, Norway; Lyse Energi, Norway; Vattenfall, Sweden
- Operator: NorthConnect

Construction information
- Construction cost: £1.3 billion

Technical information
- Type: submarine cable
- Current type: HVDC
- Total length: 650 km (400 mi)
- Capacity: 1,400 MW

The NorthConnect (also known as Scotland–Norway interconnector) was a proposed 650 km (400-mile) 1,400 MW HVDC interconnector over the floor of the North Sea.

== Interconnection ==
It would have been the first HVDC route to connect Scotland's electricity network directly to that of mainland Europe (though there are existing connections from England to mainland Europe), whereas Norway already has interconnectors to Denmark, the Netherlands and Germany.

== Project partners ==
The £1.75 billion project was promoted by NorthConnect, a Norwegian company specially set up by five electricity companies (Agder Energi, E-CO, Lyse, SSE plc and Vattenfall) to advance the scheme. It was hoped that the connector will assist the growth of the Norwegian and Scottish renewable energy industries.

== Route ==
The Scottish landfall would have been at Peterhead in Aberdeenshire, where the connector will join the National Grid. The Norwegian landfall will be Simadalen at the head of the Hardangerfjord in Norway, at the Sima Kraftwerk hydroelectric plant.

== Specification ==
The HVDC cable was proposed to be approximately 665 km (413 miles) long, and have a capacity of 1,400 MW. It was expected to cost €1.7 billion.

== Project history ==
On 5 March 2013, it was announced that SSE has left the project. The Norwegian government ruled that only Statnett could own export cables. In 2016, Norway debates rules for export cables.

In June 2016, Ofgem approved NorthConnect. Other approvals were still needed.

The European Union put NorthConnect on the "Projects of Common Interest" list and supported its development with €10 million.

A 2019 analysis by the Norwegian water department indicates that the connection would be economically viable despite an increase of less than half a eurocent per kWh for Norwegian consumers.

By 2019, the project had received all the most important marine and planning consents in the UK. Following detailed design work, it was hoped that the link will be constructed between 2019 and 2022. The consortium hoped to make a final investment decision in 2020.

On 25 March 2020, NorthConnect received a letter from the Norwegian Ministry of Petroleum and Energy, informing them that NorthConnect's license applications would not be processed at the present time.

At the end of 2021, the Norwegian finance minister stated that there was no intention to process the application.

In March 2023, the Norwegian government rejected the project's license application.

== See also ==
- North Sea Link (Norway-United Kingdom)
- Cross-Skagerrak (Norway-Denmark)
- HVDC Moyle (Scotland-Northern Ireland)
- Icelink (proposed Great Britain-Iceland)
- NorNed (Norway-Netherlands)
- NORD.LINK (Norway-Germany)
- NorGer (proposed Norway-Germany)
- Viking Link (Denmark-United Kingdom)
