= Statkraft =

Norwegian hydropower company

Coordinates: 59°54′55.11″N 10°38′7.92″E

Statkraft AS
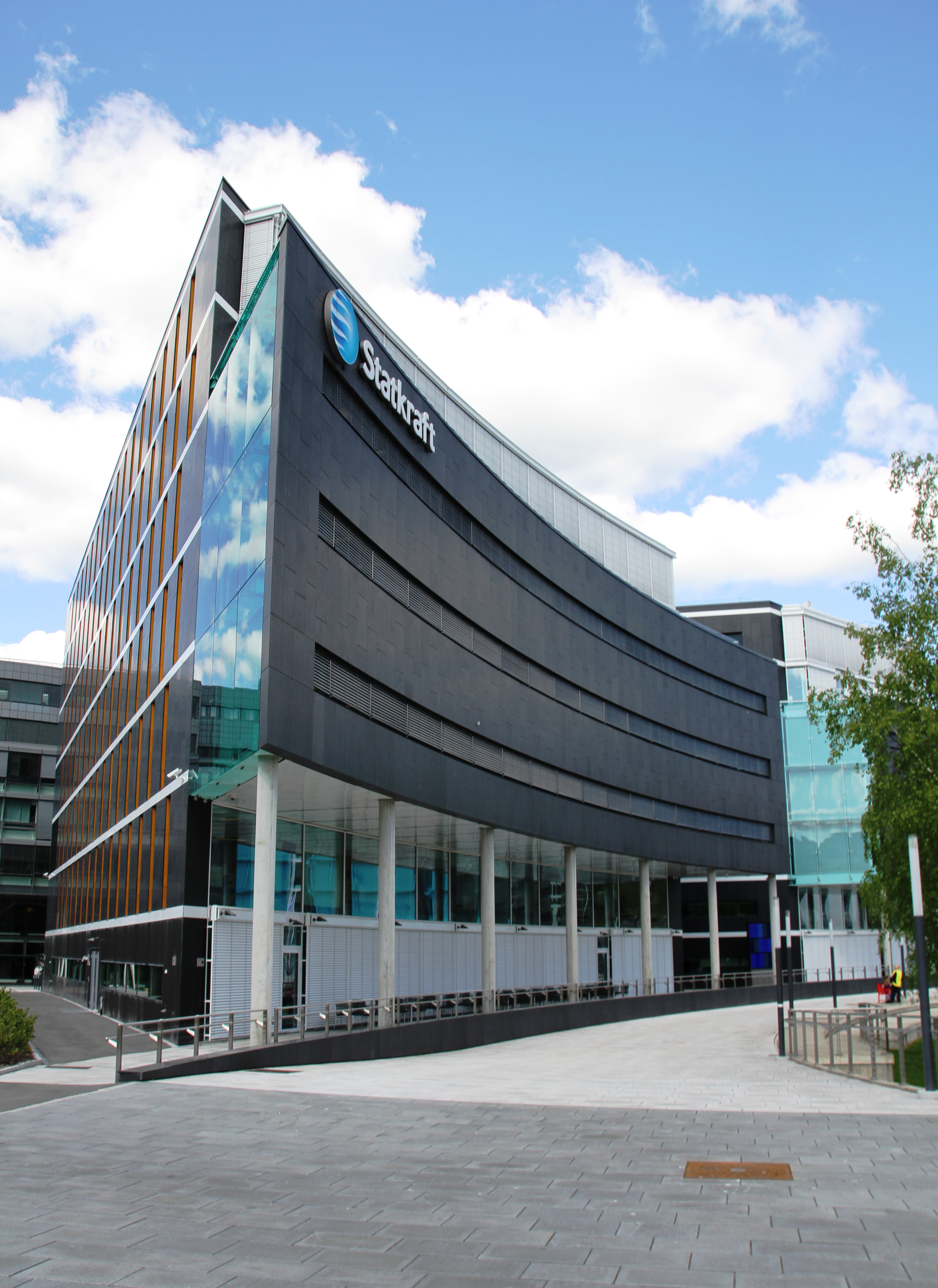
- Company type: Aksjeselskap
- Industry: Electricity
- Founded: 1895
- Headquarters: Oslo, Norway
- Area served: Albania; Brazil; Chile; Finland; France; Germany; India; Ireland; Italy; Nepal; Netherlands; Norway; Peru; Poland; Spain; Sweden; Turkey; United Kingdom; United States
- Key people: Birgitte Ringstad Vartdal (CEO); Alexandra Bech Gjørv (Chairman)
- Revenue: ▲NOK 53.7 billion (2022)
- Operating income: NOK 52.2 billion (2024)
- Net income: NOK 7.03 billion (2024)
- Total assets: NOK 341.2 billion (2022)
- Total equity: NOK 147.012 billion (2024)
- Number of employees: Over 7000 (2024)
- Parent: Ministry of Trade, Industry and Fisheries
- Website: www.statkraft.com

Statkraft AS is a hydropower company, fully owned by the Norwegian state. The Statkraft Group is Europe's largest generator of renewable energy, as well as Norway's largest and the Nordic region's third largest energy producer. Statkraft develops and generates hydropower, wind power, gas power, district heating and solar power. It is also a player in the international energy markets. The company has 7,000 employees in over 20 countries with their headquarters located in Oslo, Norway.

== History ==
The Norwegian state acquired its first ownership rights to a waterfall when they bought Paulenfossen in Southern Norway in 1895.

In 1921, the Norwegian Water Resources and Energy Directorate (NVE) was created to operate the nation's power plants. From 1950 to 1960, the state constructed large hydropower plants across the country.

In 1986, the power plants and central power grid were split off as Statskraftverkene, which was divided again in 1992 into Statkraft and Statnett. Statkraft SF was created as a government enterprise.

Through the 1990s and 2000s, Statkraft acquired a number of power plants in Norway in addition to expanding internationally. In 2004, Statkraft was reorganized as a limited company, Statkraft AS, still wholly owned by the state.

== International expansion ==
Statkraft expanded internationally over the beginning of the 21st century, opening plants in Nepal (1993), Peru (2003), Chile (2004), India (2004), UK (2006), Albania (2007), Germany (office 1999, power generating from 2007), Brazil (2008), Netherlands (office from 1998, power generation from 2018), Spain (2018) and Ireland (2018). The group also opened offices in France (2009) and the United States.

In 2007, Statkraft and E.ON signed a letter of intent to swap Statkraft's shares in E.ON Sweden in exchange for flexible power production assets and shares in E.ON. The total value of the asset swap was €4.4 billion. The transaction made Statkraft Europe's largest producer of renewable energy in 2018.

In December 2023, Statkraft acquired a 450 MW 'water battery' project next to Loch Ness in Scotland to store renewable energy.

In May 2024, Statkraft finalized the acquisition of Spanish renewables company Enerfin, the renewable energy subsidiary of Elecnor Group. This deal will add a portfolio of 1.5 GW of wind and solar projects to its assets.

== Statkraft today ==
Hydroelectric power provides the majority of Statkraft's renewable energy. The total annual power production was 70 TWh in 2021.

In 2013, Statkraft began constructing the Devoll Hydropower project In south eastern Albania. It consists of two hydropower plants, Banja and Moglicë in the Devoll valley, with an installed capacity of roughly 256 MW. Banja power plant was completed in 2016, with the third being completed by 2019. The total project is expected to cost more than 600 million euros.

Production takes place in more than 300 hydropower plants in Norway, Sweden, Germany, UK, Turkey, as well as several countries in South America and Asia. Statkraft is involved in other hydropower projects in the Nordic region and Southeast Europe. The company is developing new production capacity in selected countries in South America and Asia.

=== Wind power ===
Wind power is a renewable and emission free energy resource. The EU has set ambitious goals for the reduction of CO_{2} emissions and the development of renewable energy. Statkraft owns wind power plants in Germany and France.

=== Solar power ===
Solar power will be an even more important energy source in the future. Statkraft has worked with solar energy since 2010 and has solar power plants in India and the Netherlands.

In November 2020, Statkraft announced it had acquired Solarcentury for NOK 1.45 billion, taking full control of the company and its solar production facilities in Europe and South America.

=== District heating ===
District heating is a separate energy system that forms a natural part of the energy supply for towns and cities and densely populated areas. District heating based on renewable energy sources can have a positive environmental effect. Through the subsidiary Statkraft Varme, the Statkraft Group owns and operates a number of district heating plants in Norway and Sweden.
