= Icelink =

Proposed electricity interconnector between Iceland and UK

Former map of existing and planned HVDC interconnectors in Europe in 2012, with Icelink labelled as 1.

Icelink is a proposed electricity interconnector between Iceland and the United Kingdom via Great Britain. At 1,000 to 1,200 km (620 to 750 miles), the 800–1,200 MW high-voltage direct current (HVDC) link would be the longest sub-sea power interconnector in the world.

The project partners for the main proposal are National Grid plc in the UK, Landsvirkjun, the state-owned generator in Iceland, and Landsnet, the Icelandic Transmission System Operator (TSO). An alternative proposal by Edi Truell's company Disruptive Capital Finance goes by the name "Atlantic SuperConnection", but it requires UK government financing.

According to Landsvirkjun, it will take about five years to complete feasibility and other work, and if a decision is made to go ahead, construction and installation would take a further five to six years.

The cost is as of 2023 expected to be €3.5 bn ($3.8 bn), for the cable and stations, not counting additional power plants.

== Status ==
In 2017, the main proposal for the project was still at the feasibility stage, and, as of 2019, no further progress had been reported. As of 2019, the "Atlantic SuperConnection" proposal had still not obtained the required financial support from the UK government.

The link is highly controversial in Icelandic politics, with a fear of environmental effects associated with increasing Iceland's power supply to meet Icelink's demand, as well as concerns over increased domestic energy prices in Iceland. For the project to move forward, the Icelandic parliament needs to accept the construction, which as of 2022 is not likely.

== Northern Ireland variant ==
In the 2019 United Kingdom general election, the Democratic Unionist Party included in their manifesto a proposal for Icelink to make landfall in Northern Ireland.

== See also ==
- Electricity sector in Iceland
- Electricity sector in the United Kingdom
- Electricity sector in Ireland
- NorthConnect
- North Sea Link
- European super grid
- Xlinks Morocco-UK Power Project – Proposed electricity interconnector between Morocco and Great Britain
