= Statnett =

Norwegian state-owned energy company

Statnett SF

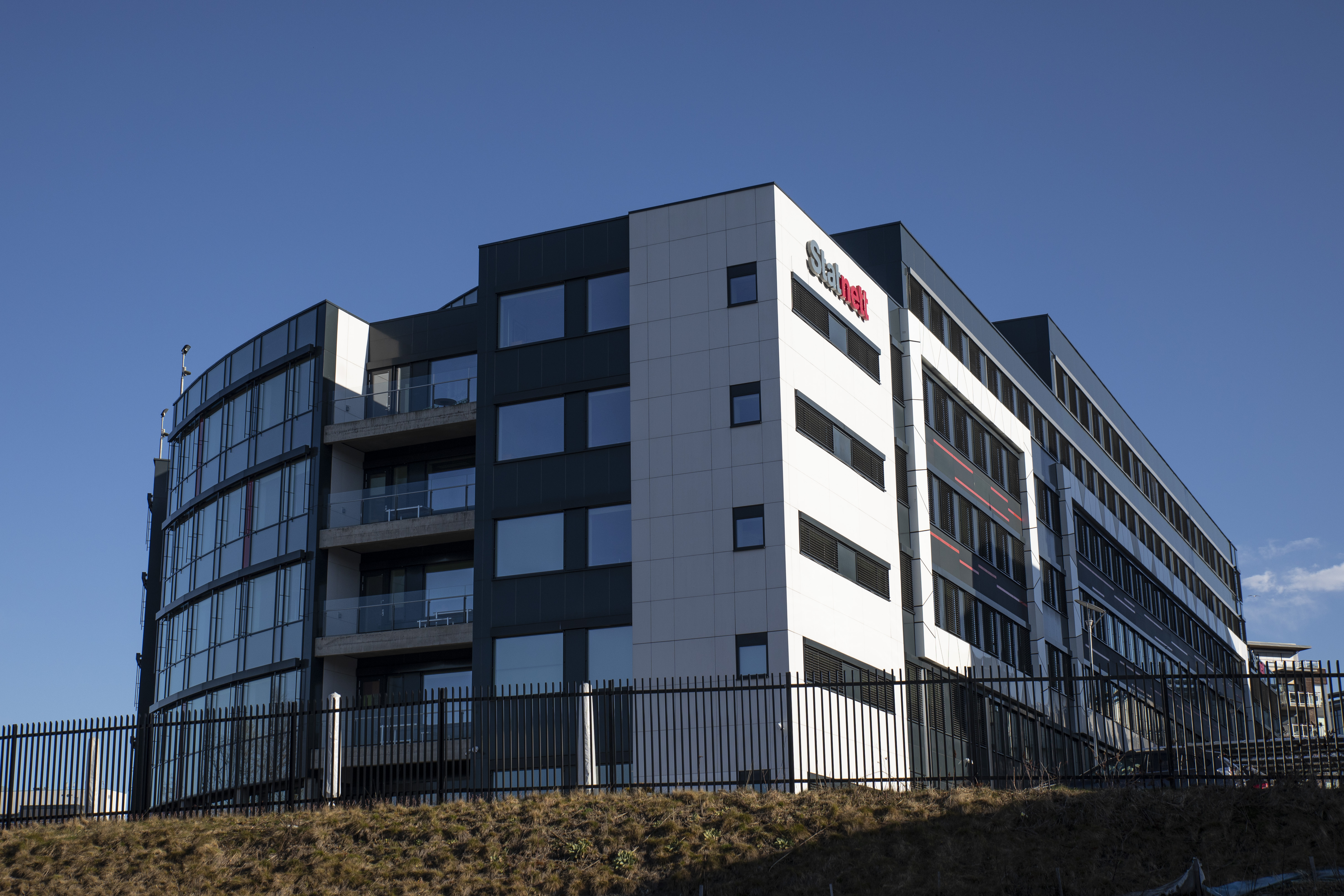
- Type: Statsforetak
- Industry: Electricity
- Founded: 1992
- Headquarters: Oslo, Norway
- Area served: Norway
- Key people: Hilde Tonne (CEO)
- Products: Power grid
- Revenue: ▲NOK 5906 million (2015)
- Operating income: NOK 1714 million (2015)
- Net income: NOK 1103 million (2015)
- Number of employees: 1632 (2021)
- Parent: Government of Norway
- Website: www.statnett.no

Statnett is a Norwegian state-owned enterprise responsible for owning, operating and constructing the stem power grid in Norway. The company has its headquarters in Oslo, Norway.

Statnett also owns 30% of the Nord Pool Spot along with other Nordic transmission system operators.

== Network ==
External image
- Grid map and development plan

Statnett is the transmission system operator in Norway, operating 11,000 kilometres (6,800 mi) of high power lines. There are plans to upgrade the western grid from 300 to 420 kV at a cost of 8 billion NOK, partly to accommodate cables to Germany and England.

The power grid in Norway is divided into three sectors: the stem net, the regional net and the local net. While it is often local municipalities who own the regional and local net, the government through Statnett owns the stem net. The stem net typically has 300 to 420 kilovolts (kV) and is used to transport electricity across long distances.

There are a number of international power cables from Norway to abroad, including lines to Sweden (3,600 MW), Finland (120 MW), Russia (50 MW), Denmark (1,700 MW submarine cable Cross-Skagerrak) and the Netherlands (700 MW submarine cable NorNed). Statnett also participates in the NORD.LINK and North Sea Link projects (proposed submarine cables to Germany and England, respectively).

== History ==
Statnett's operations were originally part of Norges vassdrags- og energiverk (NVE). In 1986 NVE was split in an operation company, Statskraftverkene and a directorate, Norges vassdrags- og energidirektorat. Statskraftverkene was split into Statnett (power grid) and Statkraft (production) in 1992.

== See also ==
Statnett participates in the following international organisations:

- European Network of Transmission System Operators for Electricity
- ebiX
