= North Sea Link =

Subsea electricity transmission line

Location
- Country: Norway, United Kingdom
- General direction: northeast–southwest
- From: Kvilldal, Norway
- Passes through: North Sea
- To: Blyth, England

Ownership information
- Partners: Statnett; National Grid plc

Construction information
- Cable manufacturer: Prysmian (offshore section); Nexans (onshore section)
- Cable layer: C/S Giulio Verne; C/S Nexans Skagerrak
- Substation manufacturer: ABB
- Substation installer: ABB
- Commissioned: 1 October 2021

Technical information
- Type: submarine cable
- Current type: HVDC
- Total length: 720 km (450 mi)
- Capacity: 1,400 MW
- DC voltage: ±515 kV
- No. of poles: 2 (bipole)
- No. of circuits: 1

The North Sea Link is a 1,400 MW high-voltage direct current submarine power cable between Norway and the United Kingdom.

At 720 km (450 mi), it was the longest subsea interconnector in the world when it became operational on 1 October 2021.

== Route ==
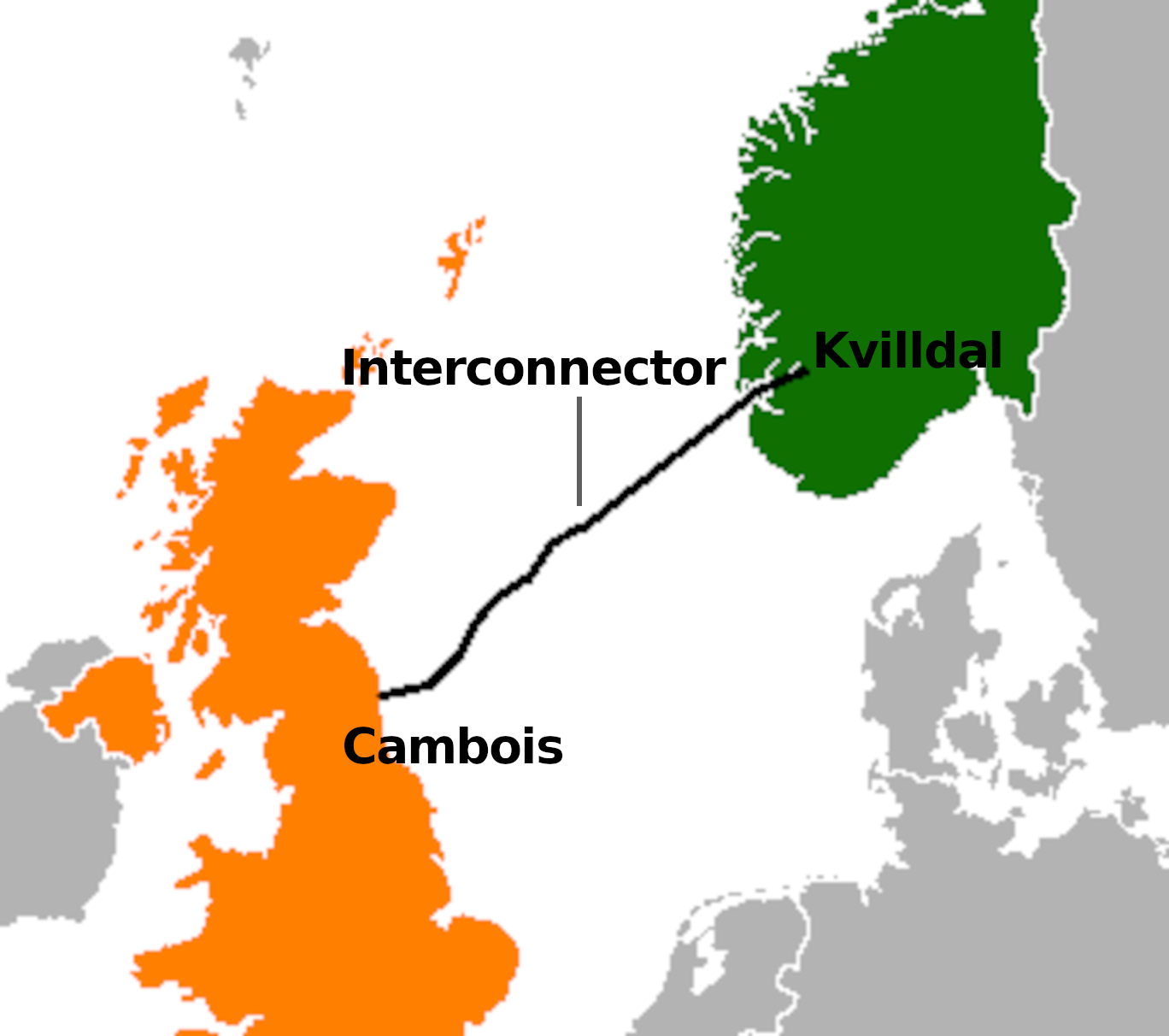
Map of cable route

The cable runs from Kvilldal in Suldal Municipality, Norway, to Cambois near Blyth in England. The converter station is located near to the cable landfall in East Sleekburn and is connected to the National Grid at the Blyth substation.

== Technical description ==
The cable is 730 kilometres (390 nautical miles) long, and has a capacity of 1,400 MW. The estimated cost of the project was €2 billion, and it became operational in 2021, as planned.

== Project participants ==
It is a joint project of the transmission system operators Statnett and National Grid.

The offshore cable was supplied by Prysmian and manufactured at the Arco Felice factory in Naples, Italy. It was installed by the cable-laying vessel Giulio Verne. Cable for the fjord, tunnel and lake sections, and the onshore connection in Norway, was supplied by Nexans and manufactured at Nexans' plant in Halden, Norway. It was laid by using the Capjet trenching system and the cable-laying vessel Skagerrak. The HVDC converter stations were built and installed by the ABB Group.

== Project history ==
The project was first proposed in 2003, when Statnett and National Grid planned a 1,200 MW interconnector between Suldal in Norway and Easington, County Durham, in the United Kingdom. This project was suspended.

In October 2009, Statnett and National Grid announced they were conducting a feasibility study of the cable. According to the pre-feasibility study the project would be economically and technologically feasible. It would be a commercial cable jointly owned by Statnett and National Grid NSN Link, a subsidiary of National Grid.

In 2010, there was speculation that the interconnection may also connect the North Sea wind farms as well as offshore oil and gas platforms, becoming the backbone of the proposed North Sea Offshore Grid. In 2014, National Grid quoted various groups in favour of more interconnections.

The route survey of the offshore section was conducted by MMT in 2012.

In March 2015, Statnett and National Grid announced a decision to start the construction phase, a month after Nemo link, a similar connection between the United Kingdom and Belgium, was announced. Along with Viking Link from Denmark, they would increase the UK's electricity interconnection level (transmission capacity relative to production capacity) from the 6% it was in 2014.

Construction of the UK on-shore cable between the landfall at Bucca headland and the converter station site at East Sleekburn was completed in February 2020, with the converter station under construction. The cable crossed the 700-metre-deep (2,300 ft) Norwegian trench. A 2.3-kilometre (1 7/16-mile) tunnel was drilled from the fjord through the mountain to the lake Suldalsvatnet, and the cable was floated across the lake to the Kvilldal connection point. As of January 2021, the converter station in Suldal had been connected to the grid.

=== Operation ===
On 8 June 2021, it was announced that construction had been completed, and after a period of testing the interconnector became operational on 1 October 2021. Initially the link operated at a maximum of 700 MW, half its capacity, and then increased to a gigawatt. A flaw in the English converter temporarily restricted power until the full 1,400 MW could be achieved. The interconnector was switched from monopole to bipole operation in January 2022. 1,300 MW was achieved in April 2023, and full 1,400 MW operated by June 2023. While the main direction is from Norway to England, the cable is only fully utilized occasionally.

== Economic effect ==
HVDC connections around Europe In operation Under construction Proposed/planned

After being fully operational, the North Sea Link gives the UK access to the south Norway bidding area (NO2) of Nord Pool Spot via the cable's own auction function. It has an annual transmission capacity of 12.3 TWh. According to analysis by the United Kingdom market regulator Ofgem, in the base case scenario the cable would contribute around £490 million to the welfare of the United Kingdom and around £330 million to the welfare of Norway. In this analysis, over the 25-year cap and floor regime (a regulation for how much money a developer can earn once the interconnector is in operation) the benefit to United Kingdom consumers is expected to be around £3.5 billion under the base case scenario. This could reduce the average domestic consumer bill in the United Kingdom by around £2 per year.

According to Auke Lont, CEO of Statnett, Norway can use the interconnector to import electricity at times of peak supply in the United Kingdom, allowing a temporary reduction in hydroelectric output in Norway and a corresponding increase at peak Norwegian demand times. When England has negative pricing, Norway imports near the maximum 1.4 GW.

In 2014, the Norwegian energy service provider Markedskraft analysed the impact of two interconnectors under construction from Norway: the North Sea Link and NorGer, a submarine cable of identical capacity connecting Norway with Germany. The electricity will at any moment flow towards the country with the highest price and these price differentials generate income for the interconnector whether the electricity flows one way or the other. Markedskraft estimated that while the Norwegian import and export via NorGer will zero out in 2020, the annual net export to the UK via North Sea Link is projected to be about 10 TWh, i.e. almost all of the interconnector's annual capacity. Markedskraft go on to estimate that the increased demand for Norwegian electricity via North Sea Link will increase the price of electricity in Norway by 25 NOK/MWh (ca. 2.6 €/MWh). A 2016 study expects the two cables to increase price in South Norway by 2 øre/kWh, less than other factors. Statnett said in March 2022 that the very high European gas prices were the main factor of the large increase in electricity prices in Southern Norway in late 2021. The two new cables NSL and NordLink, were responsible for €5―15/MWh, or 10% of the increase for the entire year. Statnett predicted more hours with imports of zero price electricity, as the rest of Europe gets more solar and wind power, and this happens sometimes, allowing South Norway to act as a "battery" and transit area between shifting high and low price areas in Europe. June 2023 was the first time the cable "bought" power in Norway at negative prices.

== See also ==
- List of high-voltage transmission links in the United Kingdom
- List of high-voltage transmission links in Norway
- Icelink
- NorthConnect
- NeuConnect
