= NordLink =

Power cable between Norway and Germany

NORD.LINK
- Location of NORD.LINK

Location
- Country: Norway; Germany
- From: Ertsmyra, Norway
- Passes through: North Sea
- To: Büsum shore and Wilster substation, Germany

Ownership information
- Partners: Statnett; TenneT TSO / KfW

Construction information
- Commissioned: May 2021

Technical information
- Type: submarine cable, land cable, overhead line
- Current type: HVDC
- Total length: 625 km (388 mi)
- Capacity: 1,400 MW
- DC voltage: 500 kV
- No. of poles: 2
- No. of circuits: 1

NordLink is a subsea 1,400 megawatt (MW) HVDC power cable between Norway and Germany, opened in May 2021. The 625 kilometres (388 mi) long line operates at a voltage of 500 kV DC. It consists of 54 kilometres long land cable in Schleswig-Holstein, Germany, a 516 kilometres long submarine cable between Germany and Norway and a 53 kilometres long overhead line with 140 towers in Norway.

== Construction ==
It is estimated to cost €1.5–2 billion, which was financed in 2015 when Statnett decided to realize the project. The interconnector was installed between a new substation at Ertsmyra (near Tonstad) in Norway and Wilster substation in Schleswig-Holstein in Germany. The connection was expected to be completed in 2020. When testing in September 2020, it accidentally imported the full 1,400 MW into Norway for almost a minute, causing cascading grid effects such as a 0.5 Hz frequency change across the Nordic synchronous area. The opening ceremony took place on 27 May 2021.

== Operation ==
In November 2021, amid high demand for electricity in Europe, the increased exports from Norway to continental Europe caused conflict with the grid operator of Sweden, which cut export capacity in half, causing the Norwegian operator to do the same for exports to Sweden (on which Denmark and Finland also rely). Grid constraints inside Norway and Germany sometimes restrict NordLink capacity to less than maximum.

== Ownership ==
The Norwegian state-owned company and transmission system operator, Statnett SF, owns 50% of the project, whilst the Dutch transmission system operator TenneT TSO and the German state-owned bank KfW own the other half. A cable between Norway and Germany is listed in the EU's projects of common interest (PCI).

== Sites ==
Site	Coordinates
Tonstad HVDC converter station	58°40′06″N 6°45′15″E
Djupvik Cable Terminal	58°15′59″N 6°40′47″E
Wilster HVDC converter station	53°55′10″N 9°20′40″E

== Waypoints ==
List of waypoints

Overhead Line in Norway

- 58.668191°N 6.754443°E
- 58.666015°N 6.754816°E
- 58.661637°N 6.752370°E
- 58.640510°N 6.734042°E
- 58.638123°N 6.732905°E
- 58.634824°N 6.732181°E
- 58.617876°N 6.742406°E
- 58.615218°N 6.743521°E
- 58.604370°N 6.754100°E
- 58.561731°N 6.765988°E
- 58.521948°N 6.781778°E
- 58.496124°N 6.797595°E
- 58.447191°N 6.846092°E
- 58.418788°N 6.862544°E
- 58.387269°N 6.874148°E
- 58.350374°N 6.883444°E
- 58.338308°N 6.878638°E
- 58.336007°N 6.873472°E
- 58.327261°N 6.842412°E
- 58.326745°N 6.838665°E
- 58.325361°N 6.834059°E
- 58.320269°N 6.820600°E
- 58.298248°N 6.790718°E
- 58.277520°N 6.760811°E
- 58.269953°N 6.710898°E
- 58.266586°N 6.680294°E

== See also ==
- List of high-voltage transmission links in Norway
- NorGer
- Scotland-Norway interconnector
