= List of high-voltage transmission links in Denmark =

List of high-voltage transmission links in Denmark including some under construction or proposed.

== International links ==
| Name | Substation DK | Substation 2 | Length (km) | Voltage (kV) | Power (MW) | Operational | Remarks |
|---|---|---|---|---|---|---|---|
| Bornholm Cable | Hasle | (Sweden) Borrby | 43,5 | 60 | 60 | Repaired 2004 | submarine AC |
| COBRAcable | Endrup | (Netherlands) Eemshaven | 325 | 320 | 700 | 2019 | submarine HVDC |
| Kontek | Bjæverskov | (Germany) Bentwisch | 171 | 400 | 600 | 1995 | submarine HVDC |
| Konti–Skan 1 | Vester Hassing | (Sweden) Lindome | 149 | 250 | 250 | 1965–2006 | submarine HVDC |
| Kriegers Flak Combined Grid Solution | Rødvig | (Germany) Bentwisch | | 220, 170 | 400 | 2021 | submarine AC via wind farms Kriegers Flak and EnBW Baltic II |
| Konti–Skan 2 | Vester Hassing | (Sweden) Lindome | 149 | 300 | 300 | 1988 | submarine HVDC |
| Skagerrak | Tjele | (Norway) Kristiansand | 240 | 2 × 250, 1 × 350, 1 × 500 | 1,632 | 1977 | submarine HVDC, 4 subsystems |
| Viking Link | Revsing, Jutland | (United Kingdom) Bicker Fen | 765 | 525 | 1,400 | 2023 | submarine HVDC |

In addition to the above named, submarine interconnectors Denmark has 400 kV, 220 kV and 150 kV AC transmission cables from Jutland to Germany. These cables can import 1,500 MW and export 1,780 MW of power. Denmark also has four AC (two 132 kV and two 400 kV) submarine cables connecting Zealand with Sweden. These can import 1,300 MW and export 1,700 MW of power.

== National links ==
| Name | Substation 1 | Substation 2 | Length (km) | Voltage (kV) | Power (MW) | Operational | Remarks |
|---|---|---|---|---|---|---|---|
| Great Belt power link | Fraugde | Herslev (Kalundborg Kommune) | 58 | 400 | 600 | 2010 | submarine HVDC |

== See also ==
- Electricity sector in Denmark
- List of power stations in Denmark
- Nordic energy market
- List of high-voltage transmission links in Sweden
- List of high-voltage transmission links in the United Kingdom
