= Kassø-Tjele high-voltage transmission line =

High-voltage transmission line in Denmark

High-voltage transmission line Kassø-Tjele
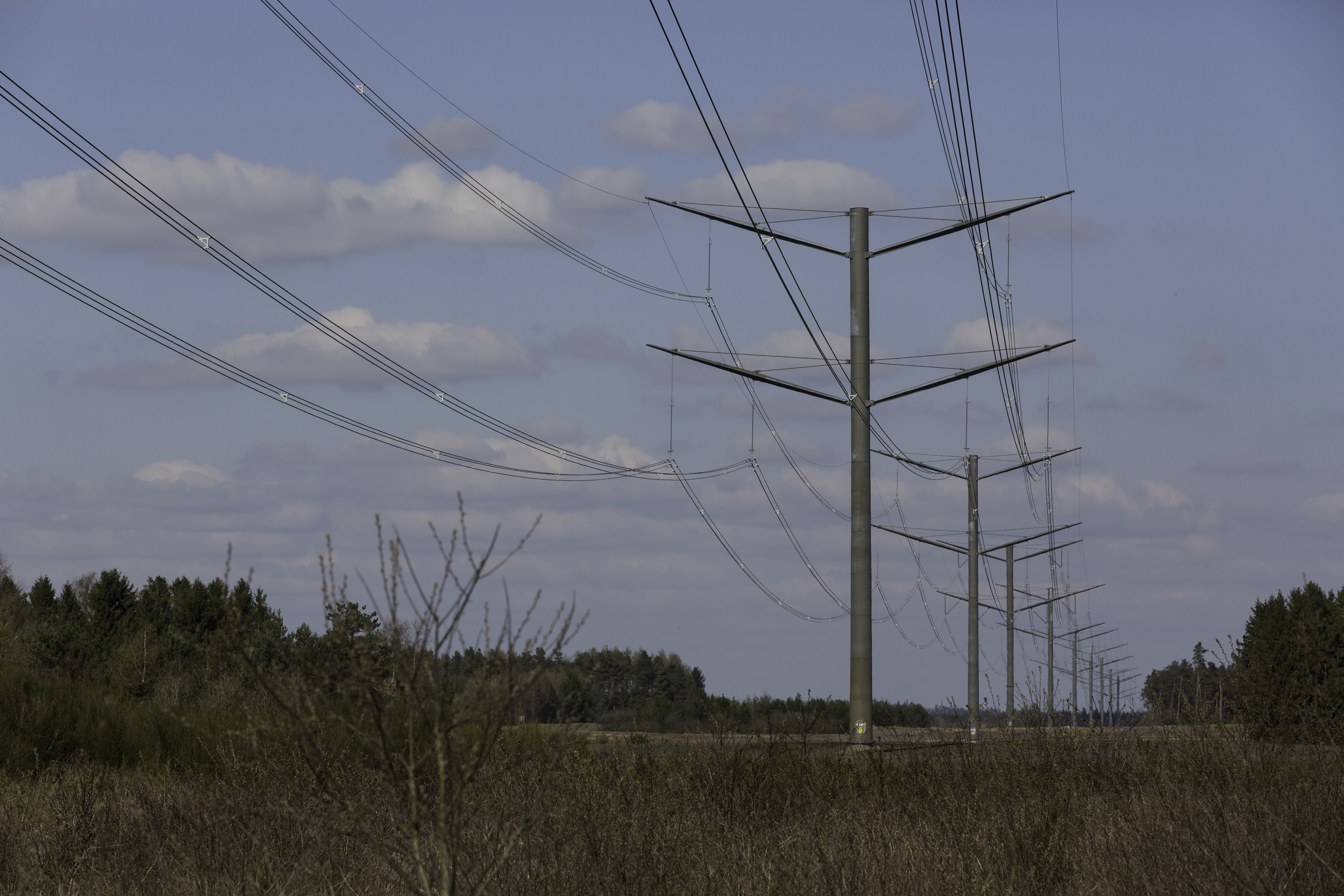
- The high-voltage transmission line Kassø-Tjele at the road between Ejstrupholm and Brande
- Map of the Kassø–Tjele high-voltage transmission line. The underground cable sections are displayed in yellow.

Location
- Country: Denmark
- General direction: North-South
- From: Transformer Station Kassø
- To: HVDC converter station Tjele

Ownership information
- Operator: Energinet

Construction information
- Commissioned: 1965, extended 2014

Technical information
- Type: Overhead transmission line with 3 underground cable sections
- Current type: AC
- Total length: 174 km (108 mi)
- No. of towers: 530
- Capacity: 2 times 1.800 MW
- AC voltage: 400 kV

The Kassø-Tjele high-voltage transmission line is a 400 kV high-voltage transmission line in Denmark from Transformer Station Kassø by Kassø west of Aabenraa to HVDC converter station Tjele by Foulum east of Viborg. Along the way, it passes the Coupling Station Revsing by Vejen and Station Askær by Brande. The transmission line is a total of 174 km long and is operated by Energinet, which describes it as the backbone of the Jutland-Funen electricity transmission network.

In the period 2012-2014, the transmission line was upgraded from a single-system line with a capacity of 1.150 MW for a two-system line with a capacity of 2 x 1.800 MW or a total of 3.600 MW. The upgraded transmission line was put into operation on November 28, 2014.

The main purpose of the expansion of the transmission line was to be able to exchange surplus production of electricity with other countries, i.a. to and from Norway via the Skagerrak connections. In particular, the expansion of electricity production from wind turbines made it necessary to be able to transport electricity from wind turbines when there is a lot of wind and the production of wind turbine power is high, in order to be able to utilize the energy.

== Masts ==
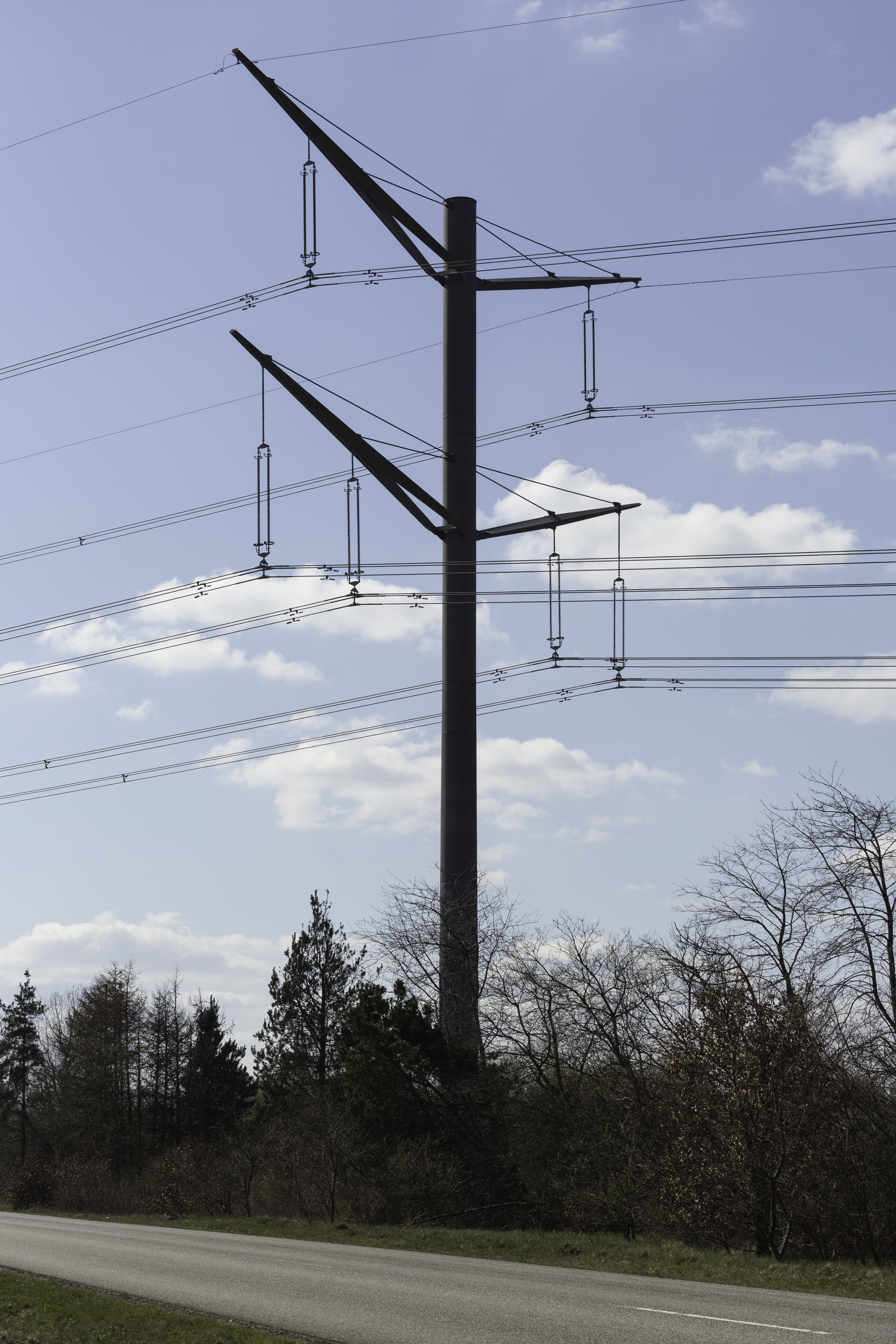
One of the approx. 530 masts

The transmission line is carried by approx. 530 masts of a new type which have been developed especially for this high voltage transmission line. The masts are called eagle masts and are single-legged pipe masts with traverses (crossbeams) on two floors. The masts are 44.5 m high and 31 m wide at the traverses. The pipes are made of corten steel and the traverses of hot-dip galvanized steel.

During the planning phase, another proposal for a type of mast was also made, the so-called stealth mast with a stainless steel pipe shaft. Most design and landscape impact assessments preferred the stealth mast over the eagle mast, but it was deselected as the stainless steel on the mast is three times as expensive as hot-dip galvanized steel. In addition, there would be a risk of fatigue fractures, as the shaft and traverses of the stealth mast were gathered in a single node that would be heavily loaded, and the rigid construction of the mast would not dampen mechanical oscillations sufficiently.

== Environmental and health measures ==
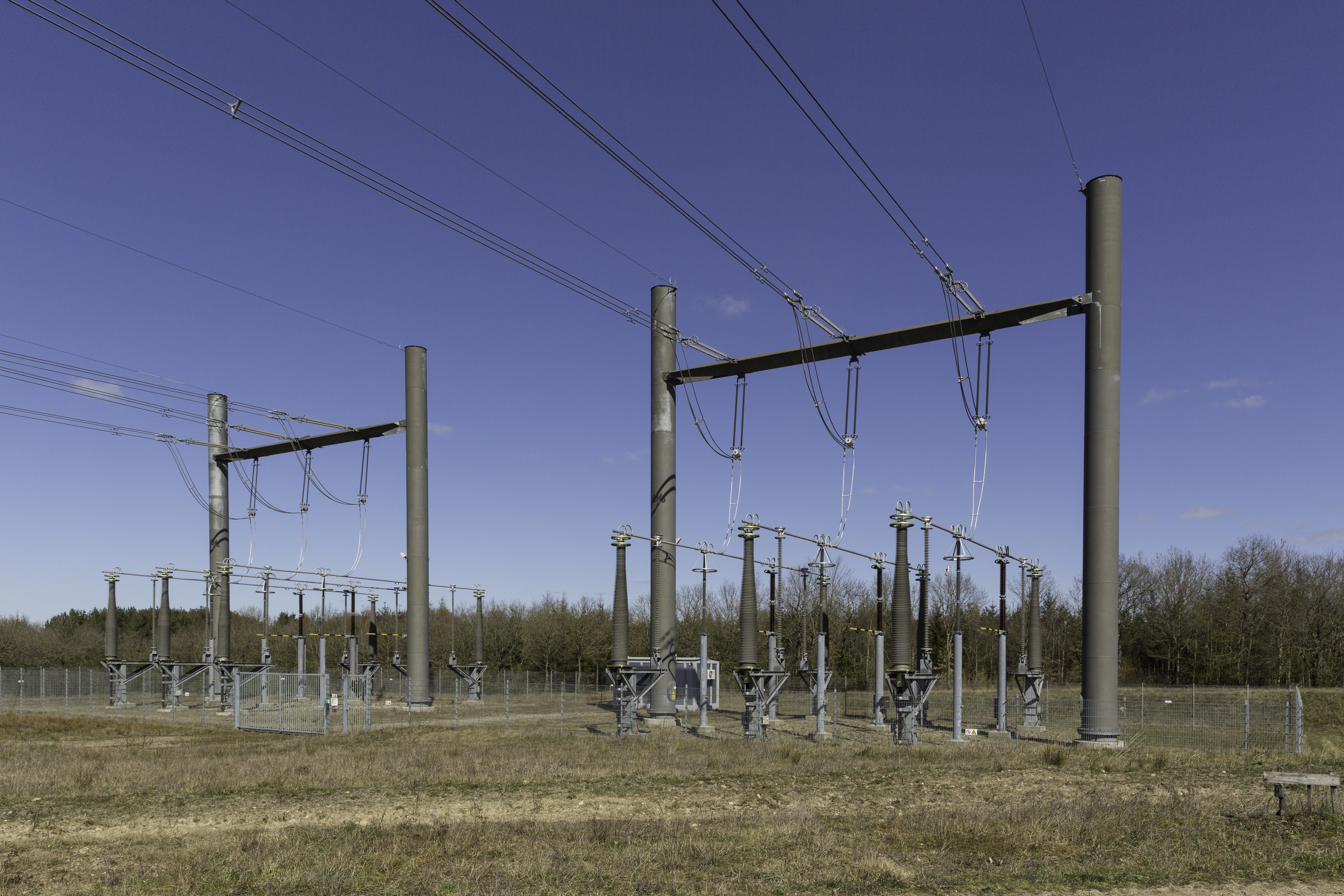
The connection between overhead lines and underground cables takes place via transition stations, as here on the southwest side of Bølling Lake near Engesvang

In three places with special natural and landscape conditions, the transmission line is routed through earth cables. It is at Gamst Lake Meadows near Vejen, Bølling Lake near Engesvang and the Nørreå Valley near Viborg.

When choosing the mast type and cable suspension, emphasis was placed on minimizing the magnetic field around the transmission line. 3 conductors are also used per phase which should reduce the noise from the wires in humid weather.

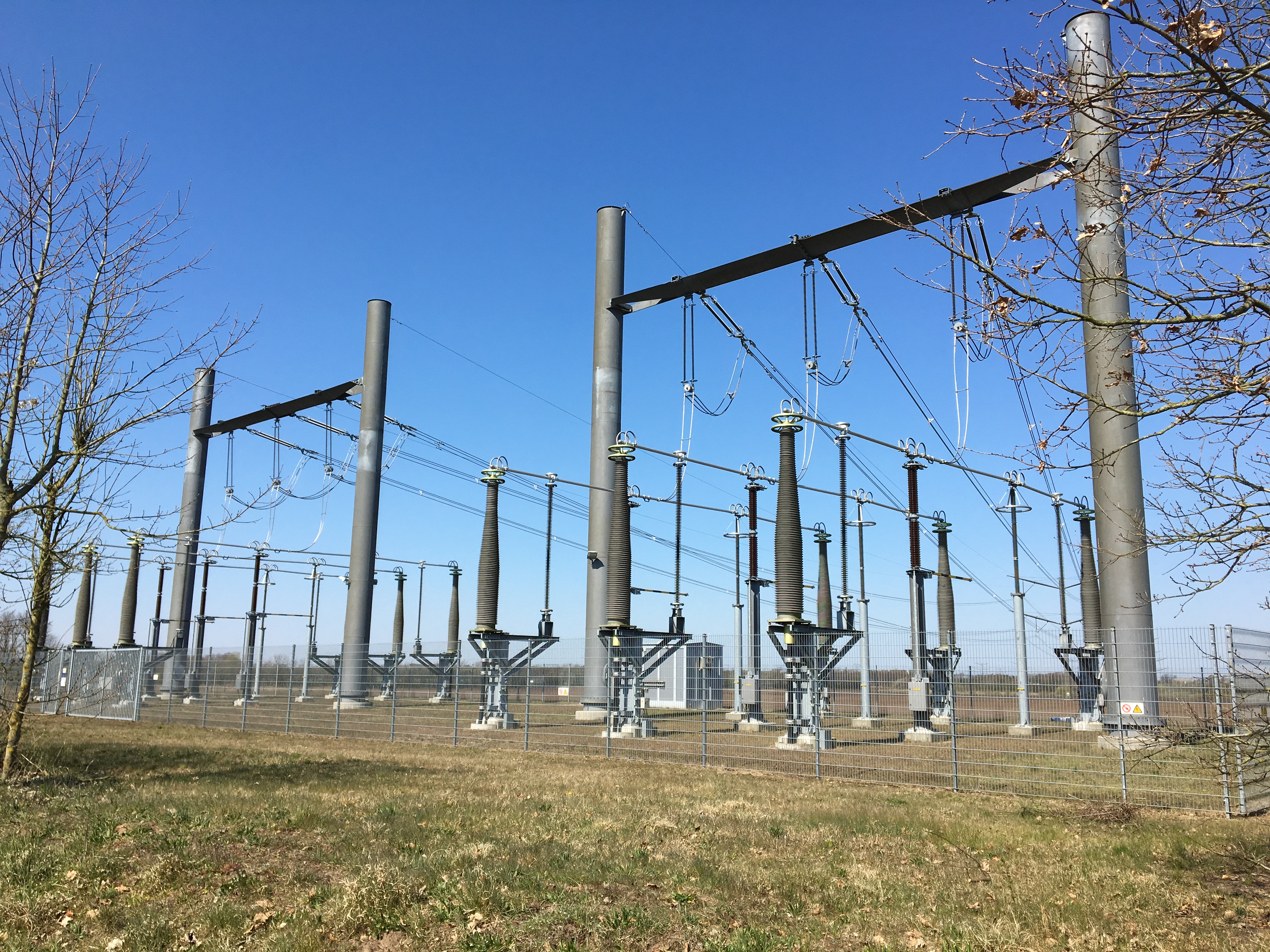
The connection through underground cables at the north side of Gamst Lake Meadows

== Economy ==
The price for the upgraded transmission line which was built from 2012 to 2014 was approx. DKK 10 million pr. kilometer overhead line and approx. DKK 30 million per kilometer cable. In addition, approx. DKK 40 million per cable routing for two cable transfer stations.

In total, the new installation was budgeted to cost DKK 2.5 billion in 2010 prices if the entire connection was made with the overhead line, and DKK 2.9 billion if underground cables were used at 4 environmental focus areas (Gamst Lake Meadows, Billund, Bølling Lake and Nørreå Valley). They ended up using underground cable in 3 of the 4 areas, at Billund they instead moved the route further west of the city. Energinet estimated in 2010 that the project in connection with the expansion of international connections to Norway, Germany and the Netherlands would provide a total socio-economic gain of DKK 1.7 billion for a pure overhead line connection or 1.3 billion for underground cables at the 4 environmental focus areas. The gain is due to minimization of internal bottlenecks and grid losses, and better utilization of wind energy.

== Routing ==
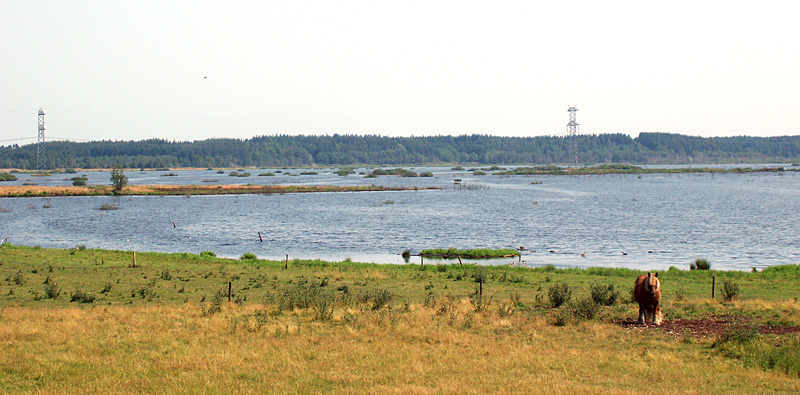
The first Kassø-Tjele 400 kV transmission line crosses Bølling Lake. Photo from 2006.

The connection was first built in 1965 on the route Kassø-Vejen-Tjele-Aars. The transmission line was built to be able to use 400 kV, but was initially operated with 150 kV. On December 20, 1978, the voltage on the Kassø-Tjele section was increased from 150 kV to 400 kV.

The first Kassø-Tjele 400 kV transmission line had a capacity of 1,150 MW. The routing from 1965 was mainly as the routing of the current connection that was built with a distance of 40 m either east or west from the first connection. The old and the new connection crossed at 17 places. The total length of the old connection was 172.3 km. It was made with overhead lines all the way and had 505 two-legged lattice masts (H-masts) with a height of up to 35 m. The distance between the masts was 380 meter on average. That was somewhat longer than for the current connection which has an average distance of approx. 330 m between the masts. The current connection could also have had a longer span, but that would require significantly larger and stronger masts than those used now, as the current connection has two systems while before only one, and the masts must therefore carry a heavier weight with more wires. The old connection was taken down after the new connection was put into operation.
