= Viking Link =

Submarine power cable between the UK and Denmark

- Map of Viking Link

Location
- Country: Denmark, United Kingdom
- Coordinates: 55°31′23″N 8°42′35″E; 52°55′49″N 0°13′14″W
- General direction: East–west
- Passes through: North Sea
- To: Bicker Fen

Ownership information
- Partners: Energinet.dk; National Grid

Construction information
- Construction started: 2019
- Commissioned: 29 December 2023

Technical information
- Type: submarine cable
- Current type: HVDC
- Total length: 765 km (475 mi)
- Capacity: 800 MW (1,400 MW by 2025)
- AC voltage: 400 kV (Jutland), 400 kV (Bicker Fen)
- DC voltage: ± 525 kV

Viking Link is a 1,400 megawatt high-voltage direct current (HVDC) submarine power cable between the United Kingdom and Denmark, which was completed in 2023. As of 2024, it is the longest land and subsea HVDC interconnector in the world. The project is a cooperation between British National Grid plc and Danish Energinet.

== Route ==
The cable runs between Bicker Fen in Lincolnshire, UK, and Revsing in southern Jutland, Denmark.

The cable has a total length of 765 kilometres (475 miles), of which 650 km (400 mi) is undersea, passing through Danish, German, Dutch and British waters. It crosses the 580 km (360 mi) long NorNed submarine power cable.

== Specification ==
The interconnector is capable of transmitting up to 1,400 MW at 525 kV, resulting in an annual transmission capacity of 12.3 TWh. The actual cable is made of copper, steel, paper and plastic and weighs about 40 kg per metre. It is similar in capacity and length to the UK–Norway North Sea Link.

== Project history ==
In November 2015 Viking Link was put on the EU "Projects of Common Interest" list, along with the COBRAcable between Jutland and the Netherlands, and the Krieger offshore wind turbine cable to Germany.

In January 2017 Viking Link announced a €1.3 billion tender for seven contracts that detail all aspects of constructing and later maintaining both the land and sea components of the link.

In March 2017 Fugro announced the completion of their contract to survey the seabed for the subsea section of the interconnector.

According to some experts including National Grid's head of strategy the UK's decision to leave the EU can negatively influence the effort to link the UK power grid with the continent and may put planned interconnectors such as Viking Link on hold. In reaction to the Brexit referendum Viking Link stated that the plans to build and operate the interconnector remain unchanged and that they consider the project unlikely to be influenced since it has a strong business case, while National Grid claims that leaving the internal energy market would jeopardize interconnector projects such as Viking Link.

In July 2019 Viking Link announced three contracts totaling €1.1 billion, one with Siemens Energy for the two onshore substations and two for the manufacture and laying of the undersea cables to be done by Prysmian Powerlink S.r.l. and NKT HV Cables AB. Construction work was scheduled to start mid-2020 and expected to be complete by end 2023.

In November 2019, it was announced that preparation work had started on the beach in Denmark.

In December 2019, contracts were awarded for the UK onshore construction works.

In July 2020, Viking Link announced that work had started on the 475 mile (765 km) interconnector. Construction commenced with the building of an access road at Bicker Fen.

In February 2021, Balfour Beatty started drilling work for the project.

Land cables and submarine cables were installed between 2020 and 2023.

In 2023 the cable laying contractor Prysmian announced that the land cables and 870 km of the 1250 km dual subsea cable had been laid with the remaining 380 km subsea cable to be laid between April and July 2023. The undersea section of the link was completed in July 2023.

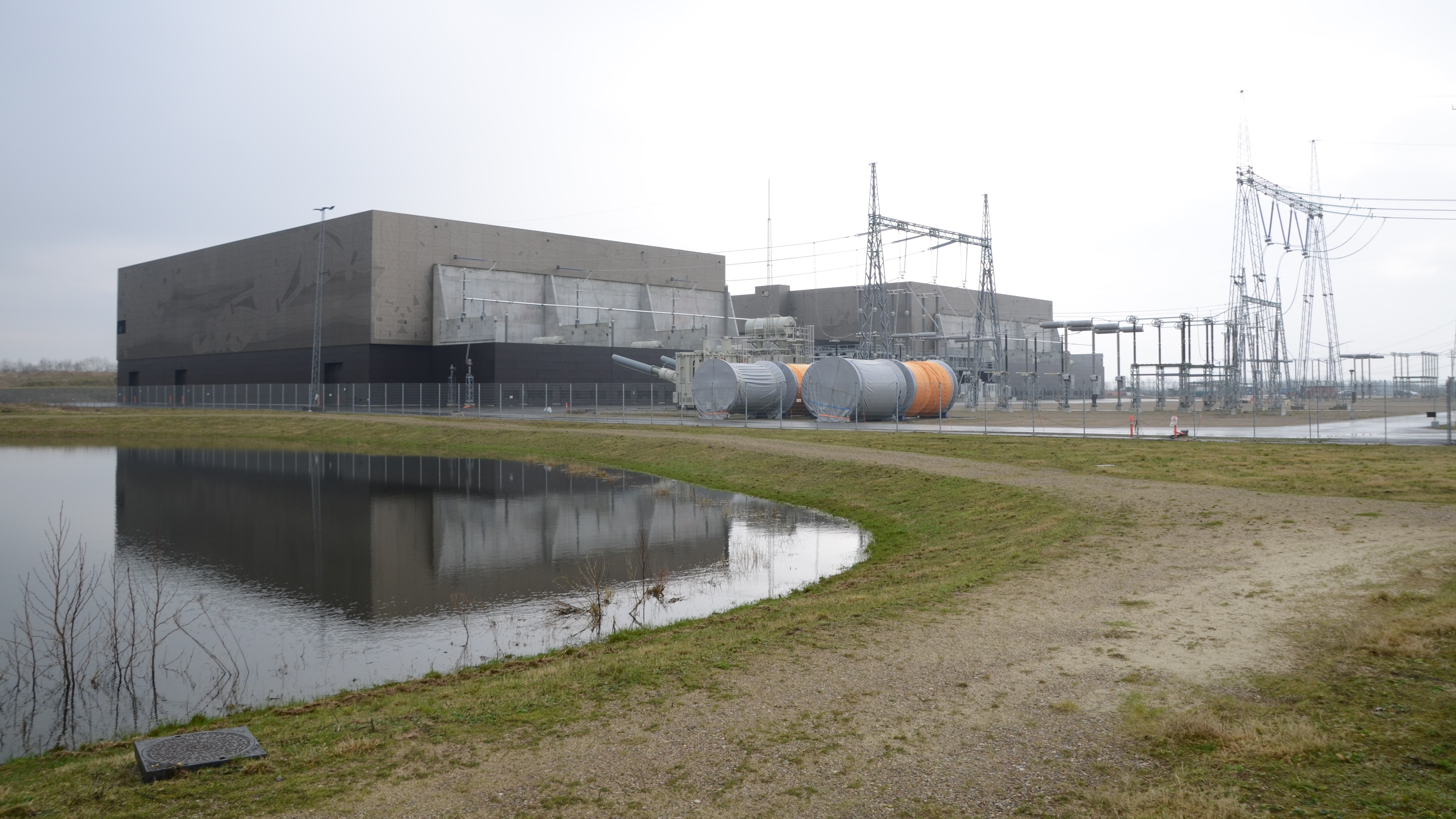
The Revsing converter

In August 2023 the cable including its terminations, land and subsea joints completed final electric testing at 735 kV, i.e. 40% above its nominal operating voltage.

A new 400kV supporting power line in Denmark to increase internal transmission capacity (and reduce overhead power lines from 324 km to 145 km) was delayed until late 2025.

Commissioning of the subsea cable started during November and December 2023 and commercial operation commenced on 29 December 2023. However, capacity was limited to 800 MW until the associated grid is completed in Denmark around 2025. From 14 January 2024 the Danish transmission system operator Energinet implemented changes that allow Viking Link to transmit at its full capacity under certain circumstances. As such, from 15 to 19 January where the Dutch-Danish COBRAcable was undergoing maintenance, Viking Link was able to transmit at its full capacity. In February 2024 the cable suffered an outage after a minor fire in a switching station in Revsing, Denmark.

From its commencement of commercial operation on 29 December 2023 until the end of Q1 2024 Viking Link transmitted 1733 GWh, for a capacity factor of 55%. The transmission was from Denmark to the UK 80% of the time.

== Economic impact ==
The cable will increase the UK's electricity interconnection level (transmission capacity relative to production capacity) from its comparatively low rate of 6% in 2014.

The Viking Link connects the UK to the west Denmark bidding area (DK1) of Nord Pool Spot. An analysis in 2016 showed a DKK 5.6 billion overall benefit for the society using Viking Link, and a DKK 20 billion benefit for heat pumps in district heating. Combining the two yields a benefit of DKK 22.8 billion. By 2022 prices in Denmark were projected to rise by 15 DKK/MWh, and fall in England. The investment was estimated at 13.4 billion DKK.

By the first quarter of 2024 Viking Link had earned ca 20 million Euro, to be evenly split between National Grid plc and Energinet.

== See also ==
- Electricity sector in Denmark
- Electricity sector in the United Kingdom
- Energy in Denmark
- Energy in the United Kingdom
- List of high-voltage transmission links in Denmark
- List of high-voltage transmission links in the United Kingdom
- Triton Knoll, an 857 MW offshore wind farm under construction, also with an onshore cable linking to Bicker Fen
