= COBRAcable =

Submarine HVDC power line between Denmark and the Netherlands

- Outline of the COBRAcable

Location
- Country: Denmark, the Netherlands
- Coordinates: 55°31′23″N 8°42′35″E; 53°26′4″N 6°51′57″E
- General direction: northeast–southwest
- From: Endrup
- Passes through: German Bight
- To: Eemshaven

Ownership information
- Partners: Energinet.dk; TenneT

Construction information
- Cable manufacturer: Prysmian
- Substation manufacturer: Siemens
- Construction started: 2016
- Construction cost: DKK 4.7 billion; €580m.
- Commissioned: September 2019

Technical information
- Type: submarine cable
- Current type: HVDC
- Total length: 325 km (202 mi)
- Capacity: 700 MW
- AC voltage: 400 kV
- DC voltage: ±320 kV

COBRAcable (COpenhagen-BRussels-Amsterdam cable) is a ±320 kV, 700 MW HVDC submarine power cable pair between Eemshaven, the Netherlands and Endrup near Esbjerg, Denmark. The cable is jointly owned by Energinet.dk and TenneT. Its purpose is to improve the European transmission grid and thus increase the amount of variable wind power in the system while improving supply reliability. Its 700 MW capacity corresponds to an annual transmission capacity of 6.1 TWh.

== Construction ==
The interconnector has a length of 325 kilometres (202 miles), consists of two parallel cables each with a diameter of 13 cm (5.1 in) and includes fiber-optic communication. The connection has been designed in such a way as to enable the connection of an offshore wind farm at a later stage. This contributes to the realisation of a sustainable international energy landscape, a key aim of the European Union.

On the Danish side the interconnector reaches land on the western coast of the island of Fanø and end on the mainland at the converter station near Endrup where an existing power facility has been extended with 5 hectares (12 acres). The building itself has a footprint of 125 m × 36 m and a height of 21 m. A group of local residents have collaborated with Energinet.dk in deciding the outer appearance of the building and its surrounding vegetation.

The COBRAcable is a cross-border project of European significance. The European Commission has therefore allocated a subsidy to the project under the EU Economic Recovery Plan, and has designated the COBRAcable as a Project of Common Interest (PCI). In November 2015, the project was put on the EU "Projects of Common Interest" list, along with Viking Link between Denmark and England, and Kriegers Flak Combined Grid Solution between Denmark and Germany.

Construction contracts were signed with Siemens and Prysmian in 2016 and in June 2016 Prysmian subcontracted the marine survey for the cable placement to the Swedish marine survey provider MMT.

Onshore construction started in Denmark in October 2016 and in the Netherlands in January 2017.

In 2015 COBRACable was expected to be operational from early 2019, in Q1 2019 commercial operation was expected to start during Q3 of 2019.

== Operation ==
After tests between July and September 2019, the COBRAcable was commissioned in September 2019. In its first half year of operation, it had a 79% capacity factor and transported 1,400 GWh to Netherlands and 700 GWh to Denmark. It became inoperable in September 2020 due to a cable fault, and became operational in January 2021 after repairs.

== See also ==
- Electricity sector in Denmark
- Electricity sector in the Netherlands
- List of high-voltage transmission links in Denmark
- Konti-Skan, cable between West Denmark and Sweden
- BritNed, cable between the Netherlands and the United Kingdom
- NorNed, cable between the Netherlands and Norway
