= Herrenwyk power station =

Former power plant in Germany

Coordinates: 53.89988°N 10.80223°E

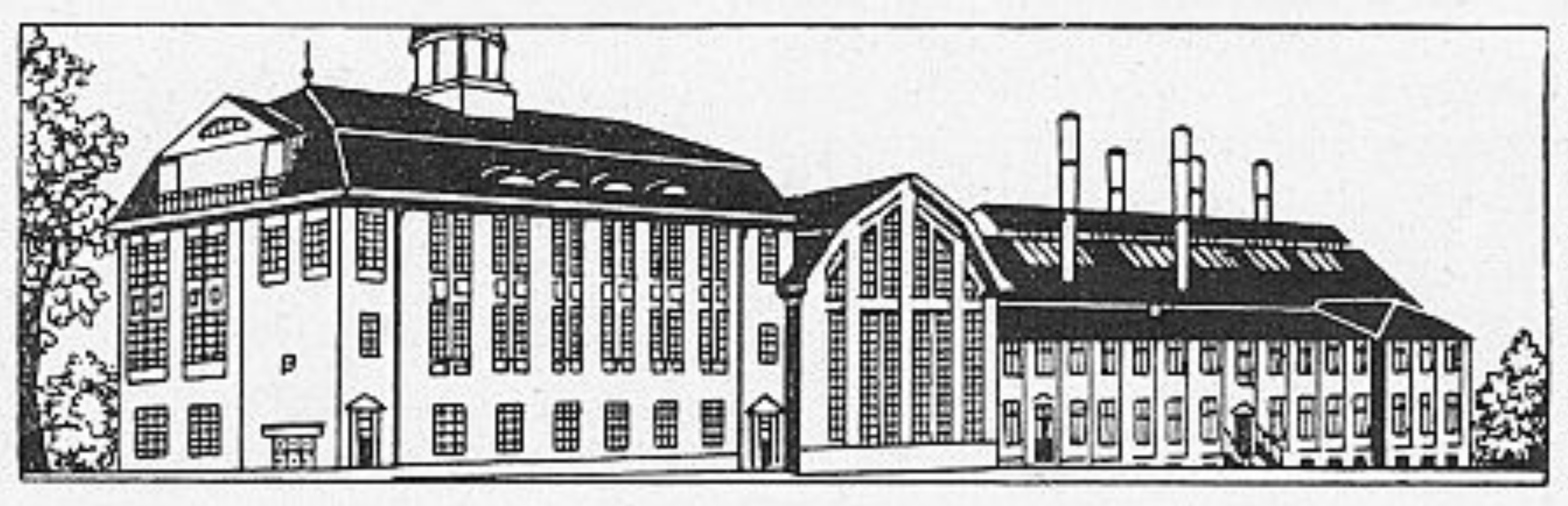
The station circa 1921

Herrenwyk power station was a coal-fired power station in Lübeck-Herrenwyk, Germany. It was the first regional power station in Lübeck The power station was owned and operated by Nordwestdeutsche Kraftwerke Aktiengesellschaft (now part of E.ON).

Construction of the power station started in 1910 and the power station was commissioned on 11 June 1911. In 1955, a new 25 megawatt (MW) unit was commissioned. In 1992, the Lübeck-Herrenwyk power station was demolished after the bankruptcy and demolition of a local metallurgical plant.

There was a proposal to build a new 400 MW power station at the site of the demolished power station. However, in 2000 E.ON abandoned this project because of the existing overcapacity in the electricity market.

In 1994, the Baltic Cable's static invertor plant was built on the site of former power station.
