= Kontek =

HVDC connector between Germany and Denmark

Kontek HVDC
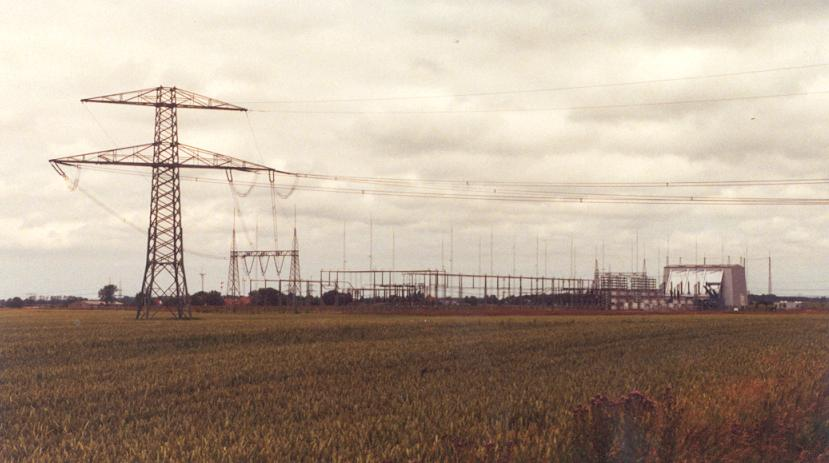
- Converter station for Kontek HVDC ín Bentwisch, Germany.
- Map of Kontek HVDC

Location
- Country: Germany; Denmark
- Coordinates: 54°06′03.2″N 12°13′1.4″E; 54°11′12″N 12°07′58″E; 54°33′44″N 11°57′41″E; 55°27′0.9″N 12°0′26.7″E

Ownership information
- Operator: 50Hertz Transmission GmbH; Energinet.dk

Construction information
- Cable manufacturer: ABB NKT Cables
- Commissioned: 1995

Technical information
- Type: submarine cables (52 km (32 mi)) underground cables (119 km (74 mi))
- Current type: HVDC
- Total length: 171 km (106 mi)
- Capacity: 600 MW
- AC voltage: 400 kV (both ends)
- DC voltage: 400 kV
- No. of poles: 1

The Kontek HVDC is a 170-kilometre (110 mi) long, monopolar 400 kV high-voltage direct current cable between Germany and the Danish island Zealand. Its name comes from "continent" and the name of the former Danish power transmission company "Elkraft", which operated the power grid on the Danish islands Lolland, Falster and Zealand and had the abbreviation "ek". As of today, the cable is operated by Energinet.dk in Denmark and 50Hertz Transmission GmbH in Germany.

Kontek is remarkable because, in contrast to similar facilities like Baltic Cable and Konti-Skan, all land sections of the 119-kilometre (74 mi) onshore lines on Falster, Zealand and Germany are implemented as underground cable. This unusual measure, which raised the construction costs of Kontek significantly, was made for practical rather than technical reasons. Obtaining permission for building overhead lines can take a long time, and hence underground cables were used in order to ensure it was completed on schedule.

== Description ==
The Kontek cable begins in the static inverter plant of Bentwisch in Germany. It runs 13 kilometres (8.1 mi) to Markgrafenheide on the Baltic Sea, where a 43-kilometre (27 mi) submarine cable section to the island of Falster begins. In this section, the Kontek crosses the Baltic Cable at 54°17′31″N 12°04′38″E through the use of a 50-centimetre (20 in) ramp. The Kontek reaches Falster near Gedser, and crosses the island via 50 kilometres (31 mi) of underground cable. Subsequently, a 7-kilometre (4.3 mi) submarine cable section then crosses the sea between Falster and Zealand. A 53-kilometre (33 mi) land cable on Zealand follows, which ends at the static inverter station in Bjæverskov.

The Kontek capacity is 600 megawatts and was commissioned in 1995.

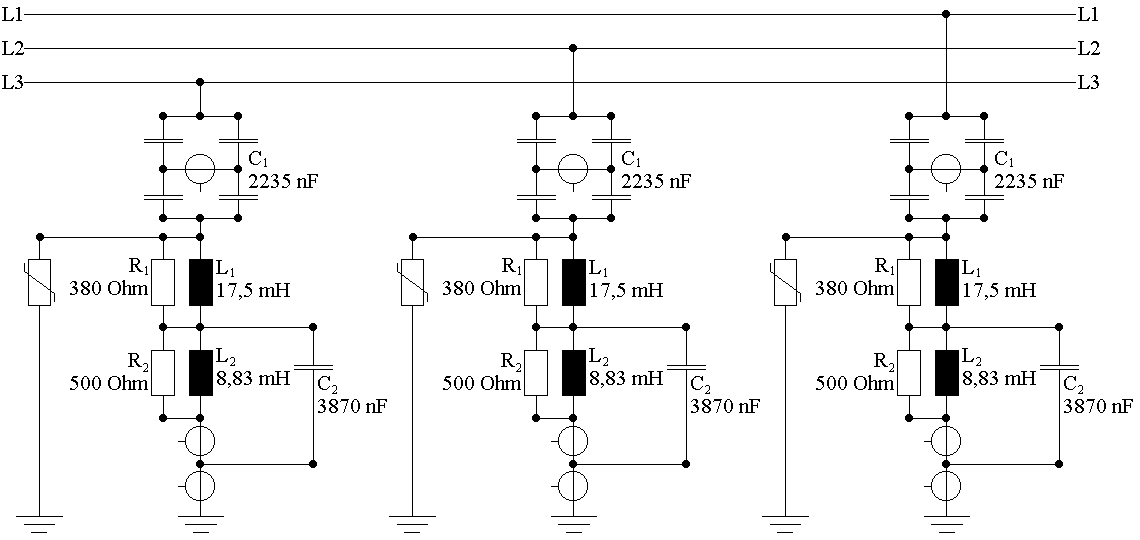
Switching diagram of AC filter used for HVDC Kontek. Each station has two such filters

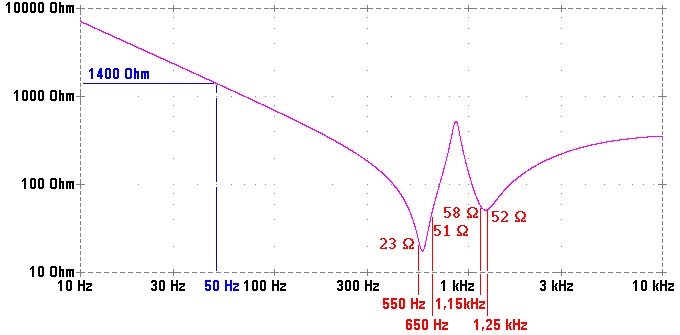
Impedance of AC filter used at Kontek in dependence of frequency. Power grid frequency and their 11th, 13th, 23rd and 25th harmonics are marked

The high-voltage cable of the Kontek is implemented as paper-isolated oil-filled cable with two copper conductors with a cross section of 800 mm^{2} permanently joined in parallel. For better monitoring of the oil, the land sections of the Kontek cable are divided in sections of approx. 8 kilometres (5.0 mi), which are separated by oil-impermeable sockets from each other. In the proximity of these sockets - at some distance from the cable route - there are automatic stations for the monitoring of the oil pressure, the oil temperature and other operating parameters of the cable. For practical reasons, the 45-kilometre (28 mi) long submarine cable section through the Baltic Sea between Germany and Denmark was implemented as a single oil-filled section without sockets. As electrode cables of the Kontek, on the German and on the Danish side, commercial plastic-isolated 17 kV-cables are used.

The static inverter station in Bjæverskov was attached to an existing substation for 400 kV/132 kV. For the construction of the static inverter plant in Bentwisch a new construction site was chosen even though only one kilometer north there is still the old 220 kV/110 kV-substation which was built in the GDR. In 2002 the static inverter station in Bentwisch was extended to a 380 kV/110 kV-substation and connected by a 110 kV-line to the old 220 kV/110 kV-substation.

A supplemental 400 MW AC connection between Germany and Zealand in 2018 and costing DKK 2.9 billion, is planned to use the Kriegers Flak offshore wind farm, enabling the wind power to be transmitted to either country as well as passing power between the countries.

== Sites ==
Name	Coordinates
Bentwisch Static Inverter Plant	54°06′03.2″N 12°13′1.4″E
Mönchhagen Kontek Cable Monitoring Cabinet	54°08′26″N 12°13′27″E
Markgrafenheide Kontek Cable Monitoring Cabinet	54°11′12″N 12°07′58″E
Kontek enters Baltic Sea	54°11′41″N 12°08′28″E
Kontek leaves Baltic Sea	54°33′44″N 11°57′41″E
Kontek enters Storstrømmen	54°57′35″N 11°50′22″E
Kontek leaves Storstrømmen	55°1′12″N 11°50′29″E
Bjæverskov Static Inverter Plant	55°27′0.9″N 12°0′26.7″E

== See also ==
- List of high-voltage transmission links in Denmark
