= Great Belt power link =

Power cable in Denmark

Great Belt power link Storebælt HVDC
- Location of Great Belt power link Storebælt HVDC

Location
- Country: Denmark
- Province: Funen / Zealand
- General direction: West–East
- From: Fraugde, Funen
- Passes through: Great Belt
- To: Herslev, Zealand

Ownership information
- Owner: Energinet.dk

Construction information
- Cable installer: JD-Contractor A/S
- Cable layer: C/B Henry P. Lading
- Substation manufacturer: Siemens
- Construction started: 2009
- Commissioned: 2010

Technical information
- Type: Submarine power cable
- Current type: LCC HVDC
- Total length: 58 km (36 mi)
- Capacity: 600 MW
- DC voltage: 400 kV

The Great Belt power link (Storebælt HVDC), also known as the Great Belt electricity link, is a high-voltage direct-current interconnection across the Great Belt between Funen and Zealand connecting two power transmission systems in Denmark.

== Background ==
Denmark has two separated transmission systems, of which the eastern one is synchronous with Nordic (former NORDEL) and the western one with the synchronous grid of Continental Europe. The phases of the two systems are not synchronized, and can therefore only be connected via direct current.

There had been several discussions and feasibility studies about possible interconnection between these systems, beginning in 1921. The connection was turned down in 1966, 1971 and 1984. The Danish system had changed due to closure of older plants and expansion of renewable energy. The purpose of the connection is to improve utilisation of the power system, share power reserves, obtain synergies in a common regulating power market and better market performance. The decision to build the Storebælt HVDC was made in December 2005 and it is based on the feasibility study carried out in 2005.

== Construction ==
The submarine power cable across the Great Belt was laid in July 2009 by a submarine contractor JD-Contractor A/S using the cable-laying barge C/B Henry P. Lading. The interconnection was commissioned in July 2010 and started commercial operations in August 2010 at a cost of DKK 1.29 billion. It was inaugurated on 7 September 2010.

== Economy ==
In the first months of operation, the connection has transferred power from West to East near full capacity. Energinet.dk estimates that the connection will save consumers in East Denmark between 150 and 200 million kroner per year, while West Denmark will retain normal prices due to the strong connections with Germany and Norway. The link has reduced the price variability in both east and west Denmark, and reduced the price of fossil fuel in east Denmark. The cable's effect on price change in west Denmark is disputed due to the strong connections with Germany and Norway. A researcher from Aalborg University claims that the reduced price variability has reduced the incentive for smart grids, and proposes that the bottleneck income be diverted from investments in physical grid to smart grid.

In 2012, Energinet concluded that a second power cable would not be feasible, but if decided, it could run between Studstrup Power Station, which lies north of the city of Aarhus and the power plant at Kyndby (Danish: Kyndbyværket) in Frederikssund Municipality. In 2015, Energinet started considering a second cable again, due to lower expectations for stationary power in East Denmark.

== Technical description ==
The Storebælt HVDC is a 600 MW Line Commutated Converter (LCC) HVDC at a voltage of 400 kV. It consists of the Fraugde converter station on Funen connected to an existing 400 kV substation, and the new Herslev converter station on Zealand connected to an existing 400 kV overhead line. The converter stations are supplied by Siemens Power Transmission and Distribution, with a -120/180 MVar synchronous condenser in each station.

The interconnector includes 32-kilometre (20 mi) long sea cable, 16-kilometre (9.9 mi) long land cable on Funen and 10-kilometre (6.2 mi) long land cable on Zealand.

== Operator ==
The Storebælt HVDC is ordered and operated by the Danish transmission system operator Energinet.dk.

== See also ==
- List of high-voltage transmission links in Denmark
- Baltic Cable
