= Klein Kussewitz =

- Ortsteil of Bentwisch
- Interactive map of Klein Kussewitz
- Location within Germany Location within Mecklenburg-Vorpommern
- Coordinates: 54°07′N 12°13′E
- Country: Germany
- State: Mecklenburg-Vorpommern
- District: Rostock
- Municipality: Bentwisch

Area
  - Total: 14.45 km^{2} (5.58 sq mi)
- Elevation: 24 m (79 ft)

Population (2015-12-31)
  - Total: 747
  - Density: 51.7/km^{2} (134/sq mi)
- Time zone: UTC+01:00 (CET)
  - Summer (DST): UTC+02:00 (CEST)
- Postal codes: 18184
- Dialling codes: 038202
- Vehicle registration: LRO
- Website: www.amtcarbaek.de

Klein Kussewitz is a village and a former municipality in the Rostock district, in Mecklenburg-Vorpommern, Germany. Since January 2018, it is part of the municipality Bentwisch.
