= Vester Hassing =

- Town
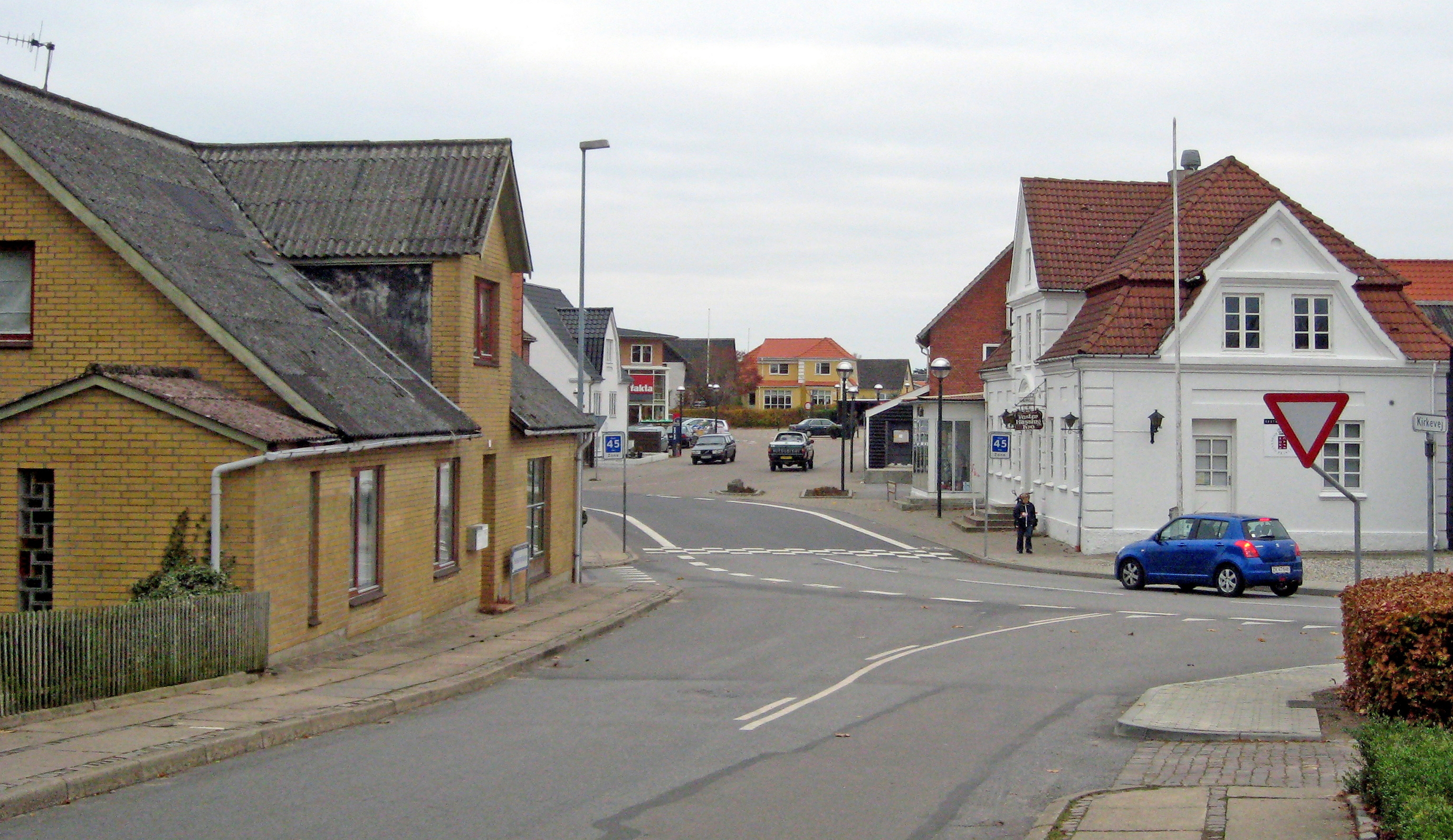
- Vester Hassing, 2009

- Location in Denmark Vester Hassing (North Jutland Region)
- Coordinates: 57°4′1″N 10°7′31″E
- Country: Denmark
- Region: Region Nordjylland
- Municipality: Aalborg Municipality

Area
  - Urban: 1.8 km^{2} (0.69 sq mi)

Population (2026)
  - Urban: 2,608
  - Urban density: 1,400/km^{2} (3,800/sq mi)
  - Gender: 1,305 males and 1,303 females
- Time zone: UTC+1 (CET)
  - Summer (DST): UTC+2 (CEST)
- Postal code: DK-9310 Vodskov

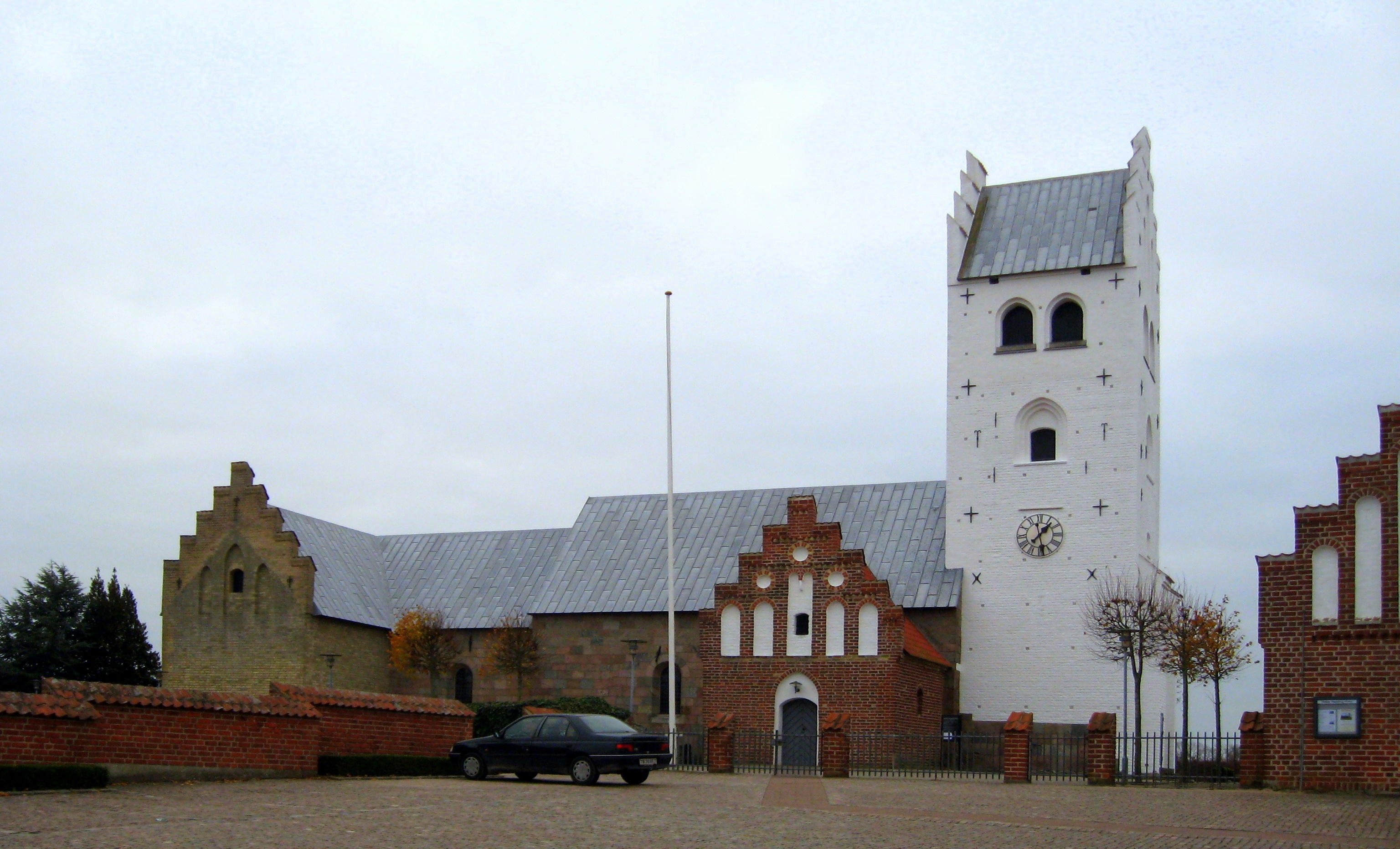
The church in Vester Hassing

Vester Hassing is a Danish town in North Jutland, Denmark immediately north of the Limfjord, and a part of Aalborg Municipality and Region Nordjylland. The town is situated 17 km to the east from Aalborg, where the majority of the citizens are working.

Vester Hassing lies in a hilly moraine landscape between the villages, Stae and Gandrup. The church dates from c. 1200 AD.

Vester Hassing experienced a surge in suburban development in the 1970s, where among others a great part the towns residential areas were built. After some years with stagnation in population, the town began to grow after year 2004, when new homes were built. Since then commerce has grown and new residential areas have been developed.

Since 1999, Vester Hassing has hosted Limfjordsfest (originally named Landsbyrock until 2007). An annual music festival, where both local and foreign artists appear. Due to economic reasons, Limfjordsfest has not been held since 2022.

At Vester Hassing there is a Danish static inverter station of the HVDC Konti–Skan with the static inverters of Konti-Skan 1 and Konti-Skan 2.

Vester Hassing has a population of 2,608 (1 January 2026)

== Famous people from Vester Hassing ==
- Erik Barslev, (Danish Wiki) (born 1955) former successful national athletics coach
- Niels Skovmand, a well-known radio host from a radio station called HIT FM Denmark
