= Fyn Power Station =

Danish power station

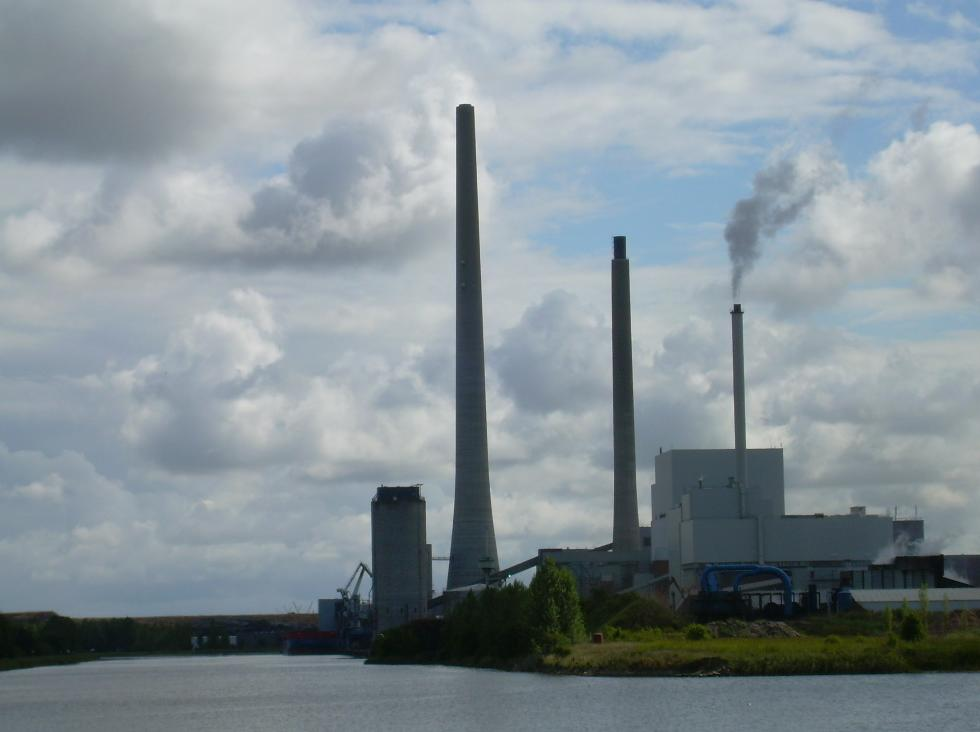
- Fyn Power Station
- Country: Denmark
- Location: Odense
- Coordinates: 55°25′47.3″N 10°24′39.6″E
- Status: Operational
- Commission date: 1953
- Owner: Vattenfall
- Operator: Vattenfall

Thermal power station
- Primary fuel: Natural gas
- Secondary fuel: Municipal waste
- Tertiary fuel: Biomass (straw)
- Cogeneration?: Yes

Power generation
- Nameplate capacity: 656 MW

External links
- Commons: Related media on Commons

The Fyn Power Station (Danish: Fynsværket) is a coal, straw, and municipal waste-fired power station operated by Vattenfall in Odense, Denmark. It has eight units, three of which were operating as of 2010: unit 3, unit 7, and unit 8. Unit 3 has a power of 235 MW (coal), unit 7 of 362 MW (coal), unit 8 of 35 MW biomass), and Odense CHP plant 24 MW. Unit 7 has a 235 metres (771 ft) tall chimney, making it the second-tallest chimney in Denmark. Unit 3 is a 141 metres (463 ft) tall chimney.

In April 2024, the Fyn Power Station was converted to use natural gas instead of coal

== See also ==
- List of power stations in Denmark
