= Skagerrak (power transmission system) =

Four submarine HVDC power line between Denmark and Norway

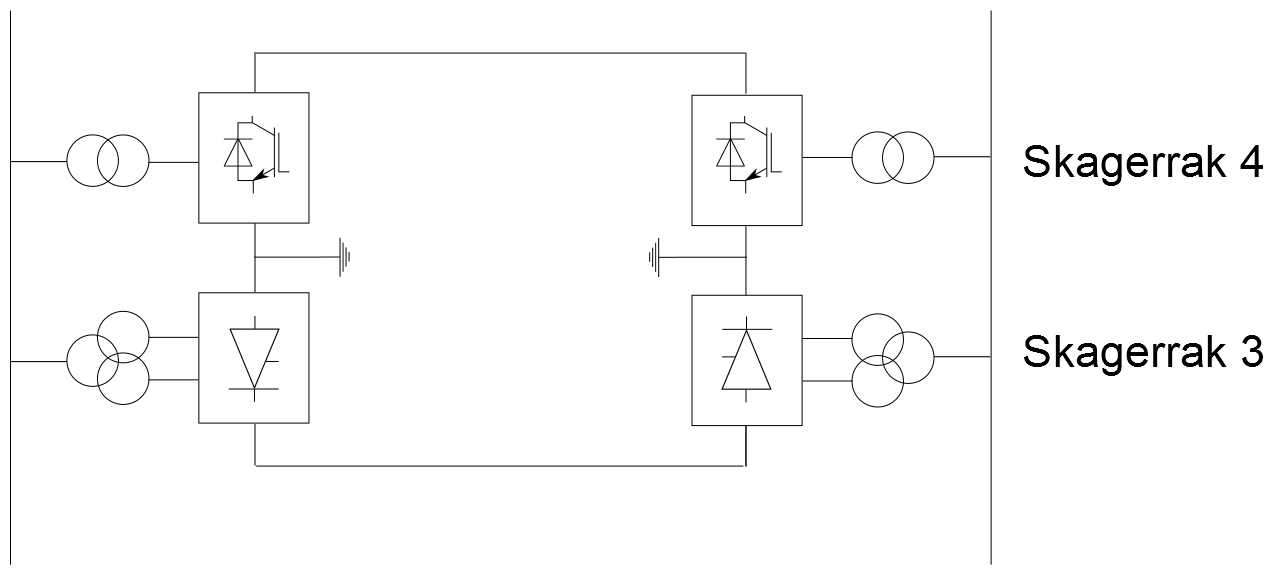
- single line diagram of pole skagerrak 3 and 4 from HVDC station Cross-Skagerrak
- Map of Skagerrak

Location
- Country: Norway; Denmark
- Coordinates: 58°15′36″N 7°53′55″E; 56°28′44″N 9°34′1″E
- General direction: north–south–north (bidirectional)
- From: Kristiansand (Norway)
- Passes through: Skagerrak
- To: Tjele (Denmark)

Ownership information
- Owner: Statnett; Energinet

Construction information
- Cable manufacturer: Alcatel; Nexans; Prysmian
- Substation manufacturer: ABB
- Commissioned: 1977

Technical information
- Current type: HVDC
- Total length: 240 km (150 mi)
- Capacity: 1,632 MW (Skagerrak 1–4)
- No. of poles: 4

Skagerrak is the name of a 1,700 MW high-voltage direct current (HVDC) transmission facility between Tjele (Denmark) and Kristiansand (Norway). It is owned and operated by Statnett in Norway, and Energinet in Denmark. The lines connect the hydroelectric-based Norwegian grid and the wind and thermal power-based Danish grid. In operation it enables more renewable energy in the energy mix, and more efficient use of electricity.

== Technical features ==
The 240-kilometre (150 mi) Skagerrak 1–3 scheme consists of a 113-kilometre (70 mi) overhead line and a 127-kilometre (79 mi) underwater cable. It has a capacity of 1,050 megawatts (MW). Both land parts in Denmark and in Norway use overhead lines from the cable landing point to the converter stations. The overhead lines in Denmark are set to be renovated in 2016 for increased lifespan. The towers were originally constructed for four poles, but were rebuilt for three conductors (three poles) when Skagerrak 3 was established. Near Aggersund HVDC Skagerrak crossed Aggersund strait overhead on 70-metre-tall (230 ft) towers with a 470-metre-long (1,540 ft) span, but was later converted to underground cables. The pylons of this span were the tallest electricity pylons of an HVDC line in Europe.

For such a long submarine cable, an AC transmission scheme would not be feasible since too much of the cable's capacity would be consumed by the capacitance of the cable itself, and the power systems in Norway and Jutland are not synchronous.

The transmission has a loss rate of 4%.

The waste heat of the transformers is enough to supply district heating economically for 1,000 homes in nearby towns, but taxes prevent that project. The adjacent Apple Datacenter (supplied in part by the Skagerrak cables via Tjele) was expected to work around the tax issue when supplying district heat to Viborg.

=== Skagerrak 1 and 2 ===
Skagerrak went in service in 1977 as a bipolar HVDC scheme. This facility was built with thyristor valves. When installed this underwater cable was the world's longest and deepest underwater HVDC power cable. The cable, manufactured by Alcatel, is laid in a maximum water depth of 530 metres (1,740 ft).

Both cables have a capacity of 250 MW at 250 kV.

=== Skagerrak 3 ===
In 1993 the scheme was extended by HVDC Skagerrak 3. Skagerrak 3 is a monopolar line for a voltage of 350 kV with a capacity of 440 MW at 350 kV. In installing Skagerrak 3, the old poles Skagerrak 1 and Skagerrak 2 were converted to monopolar HVDC schemes, which run with opposite polarity to Skagerrak 3. In 1999, the full 1,000 MW capacity was reserved by large power companies.

=== Skagerrak 4 ===
In November 2009, Statnett and Energinet.dk signed the agreement to construct Skagerrak 4. The capacity of Skagerrak 4 is approximately 700 MW with a DC voltage of 500 kV. It had been in a test phase since 1 October 2014 and became operational at the end of 2014, when strong winds created negative prices despite the new connection. It was officially inaugurated by Frederik, Crown Prince of Denmark and Haakon, Crown Prince of Norway on 12 March 2015. As for the existing Skagerrak 1–3, the grid connection points are Kristiansand and Tjele. Differently from Skagerrak 1–3, for Skagerrak 4 a cable solution is chosen for the complete route length. The 300 million DKK Prysmian land cable on the Danish side is approximately 90 kilometres (56 mi), while the 137 kilometres (85 mi) subsea cable and the 12 kilometres (7.5 mi) Norwegian land cable is to be made by Nexans for 638 million DKK. Converter stations were built by ABB, as for Skagerrak 1–3. The combined budget is 2.8-3.2 billion DKK.

The technology used was VSC, capable of black start. Although thyristor-based converters have a loss of only 0.7%, the IGBTs of VSC get close with a loss of 0.8 to 1%. Skagerrak 1 and 2 previously used Skagerrak 3 as a return cable, but 1 and 2 were again coupled so that Skagerrak 4 can use number 3 for returns. The cable also supplies 110 MW of reserve power. Some of the 24 fiber pairs may be rented for business by telecommunications companies.

== Sites ==
Site	Coordinates
Tjele HVDC Static Inverter	56°28′44″N 9°34′1″E
Denmark Overhead Electrode Line Terminal	56°37′16″N 9°28′32″E
Aggersund Crossing Tower South	57°0′0″N 9°18′7″E
Aggersund Crossing Tower North	57°0′12″N 9°17′50″E
Danish Cable Terminal	57°7′34″N 9°3′58″E
Norway Cable Terminal	58°7′45″N 8°10′3″E
Norway Electrode Line Terminal	58°10′02″N 8°15′56″E
Norway Electrode Line Branch	58°11′10″N 8°9′24″E
Kristiansand HVDC Static Inverter	58°15′36″N 7°53′55″E

== Waypoints ==
List of waypoints

Overhead line in Denmark

- 56.479315°N 9.565895°E
- 56.481149°N 9.556266°E
- 56.522125°N 9.490675°E
- 56.558318°N 9.472951°E
- 56.582026°N 9.468273°E
- 56.600344°N 9.473198°E
- 56.621169°N 9.475719°E
- 56.637062°N 9.512615°E
- 56.651797°N 9.518441°E
- 56.669172°N 9.519305°E
- 56.69005°N 9.533397°E
- 56.70589°N 9.529567°E
- 56.762998°N 9.491029°E
- 56.782921°N 9.481995°E
- 56.822549°N 9.423673°E
- 56.874104°N 9.371949°E
- 56.913653°N 9.337843°E
- 56.931020°N 9.33972°E
- 56.965994°N 9.330504°E
- 56.987038°N 9.308993°E
- 56.997079°N 9.306085°E
- 57.006387°N 9.293393°E
- 57.025084°N 9.272568°E
- 57.059085°N 9.166085°E
- 57.120022°N 9.072508°E
- 57.122346°N 9.068903°E
- 57.126189°N 9.066135°E

Underground cable in Denmark

- 57.126207°N 9.066178°E
- 57.133043°N 9.051790°E
- 57.138114°N 9.047198°E
- 57.143504°N 9.047906°E
- 57.152950°N 9.054419°E

Overhead line in Norway

- 58.129169°N 8.167713°E
- 58.130359°N 8.167219°E
- 58.130820°N 8.161973°E
- 58.133253°N 8.157971°E
- 58.136991°N 8.157617°E
- 58.142026°N 8.157048°E
- 58.159212°N 8.154495°E
- 58.178284°N 8.161898°E
- 58.185999°N 8.157005°E
- 58.194137°N 8.145944°E
- 58.217466°N 8.129132°E
- 58.225054°N 8.127528°E
- 58.231935°N 8.101022°E
- 58.230234°N 8.085262°E
- 58.227336°N 8.073497°E
- 58.223947°N 8.037486°E
- 58.219686°N 8.020642°E
- 58.218983°N 8.006635°E
- 58.222500°N 7.970731°E
- 58.228240°N 7.937998°E
- 58.232483°N 7.919941°E
- 58.248283°N 7.913911°E
- 58.255476°N 7.911841°E
- 58.258586°N 7.906154°E
- 58.260787°N 7.903225°E
- 58.261018°N 7.900715°E

Electrode line in Norway

- 58.167183°N 8.265908°E
- 58.168114°N 8.264144°E
- 58.169155°N 8.263886°E
- 58.170929°N 8.263629°E
- 58.174004°N 8.259224°E
- 58.17672°N 8.253817°E
- 58.180674°N 8.247691°E
- 58.183106°N 8.241828°E
- 58.189412°N 8.212178°E
- 58.191072°N 8.198703°E
- 58.189212°N 8.190318°E
- 58.187493°N 8.168491°E
- 58.185459°N 8.166229°E
- 58.184441°N 8.165923°E
- 58.182720°N 8.165999°E
- 58.186074°N 8.156698°E

== See also ==
- List of high-voltage transmission links in Denmark
- List of high-voltage transmission links in Norway
- Baltic Cable
- Scotland-Norway interconnector
