= Governance of hydropower in Scandinavia =

Governance of hydropower in Scandinavia, and the implementation of hydropower projects, is controlled by self-organising networks, with an open decision making process. Scandinavia is one of the largest producers of hydropower in the world.

== Hydropower in Scandinavia ==
=== Sweden ===
- 50% of electricity production comes from hydropower.
- Has over 1000 hydropower plants.
- The first state owned hydropower plant was developed in 1906.

=== Norway ===
- 95% of electricity production comes from hydropower and is the single largest producer of hydropower. Production capacity is around 31 GW in 2015.
- Production was 131 TWh in 2014, which is 62% of its potential hydropower of 214 TWh.
- Produces more electricity than it needs and looks to expand into Europe.

=== Denmark ===
- Has only three hydropower plants, powering 3000 homes, accounting for less than 0.1% of its total electricity production.
- Denmark is geographically small and relatively flat with no rivers suitable for hydropower.
- Imports most of its hydroelectricity from Sweden and Norway.
- Denmark has the lowest total energy intensity in EU.

== Governance of Hydropower in Scandinavia ==
National governments in Scandinavia consult with all stakeholders affected by hydropower plants. The interaction between stakeholders on hydropower projects in Norway can be classified as participatory governance. After the Scandinavian countries de-regulated their markets, they connected their individual markets into one common market, Nord Pool Spot. The energy that is not traded through the market is traded through contracts between suppliers, retailers and consumers.

=== Sweden ===
The Swedish electricity market was deregulated in 1996, transforming the industry from a government hierarchical system to a governance steering structure. The law stated that ‘power trading and network operations may not be conducted by the same organisation but numerous organisations thus the production and trade of electricity became competitive. The industry would be regulated by public authorities, the Energy Market Inspectorate within the Swedish Energy Agency. Its responsibilities included monitoring network tariffs and ensuring that network operators do not subsidise other interests.

=== Denmark ===
Most of Denmark's hydropower electricity comes from Norway and Sweden, supplied partly through Nord Pool Spot. Denmark has increased its renewable energy sources (wind and biomass) from approximately 0% in 1970 to 20% in 2005, which leaves them on target for the RES directive. Wind share was 39% in 2014.

=== Norway ===
The different levels of governance in Norway concerning hydropower can be seen through the economic interests, and the social responses, to the installation and expansion of hydropower projects.

==== Local level ====
At the local level hydropower can have an enormous effect on communities; creating employment, improving infrastructure, and building new or enhanced roads. However, some communities can be resistant to hydropower, especially when local incomes are dependent on tourism. For example, fishing is an important recreational sport in Norway; and hydropower may prevent local people from participating. Also the installation of hydropower upon historic sites, and areas of natural beauty, is other major concern. Local communities have been known to bring in NGO's such as WWF Norway, or Friends of the Earth, in order to resist the installation of hydropower plants.

==== Regional ====
The municipality's response to hydropower typically represents the response of local communities. Municipality must manage the concerns of the stakeholder's communities, energy companies and NGO's regarding the installation of hydropower plants.

Various municipalities have shares and direct ownership of hydropower companies. Energy companies rely on municipalities to provide information on the local environment, and cooperate to create environmental impact assessments. This can involve numerous municipalities, as the watercourse may flow through several municipalities, and therefore are bound by regulations to work together on hydropower projects.

Hydropower companies pay fees to the local municipalities in the form of taxes and license fees. Smaller hydropower plants are exempt from taxes in order to economically stimulate local development. The Norwegian Water Resources and Energy Directorate (NVE) determines the license fees paid to municipalities by hydropower companies. The NVE assess various factors such as degree of environmental disturbance and the profitability of the project.

==== National level ====
Hydropower has long been "associated with a nation-building process, representing the key infrastructure for economic growth and welfare, through electrification".

In 1991 Norway de-regulated its market and these institutions became the network for governing hydropower in Norway:

- The Ministry of Petroleum and Energy (MoPE): Energy policy of Norway, and thereby also the policies affecting hydropower.
- The Norwegian Water Resources and Energy Directorate (NVE): (Provides licences for hydropower plant projects) Managing Norway's water resources; promoting an efficient energy market and cost-effective energy system; and promoting efficient energy use.
- The Norwegian Directorate for Nature Management (DN) (Executive and advisory body for the MoPE): nature protection and management, the conservation and sustainable use of biodiversity, as well as outdoor recreation.
- The Norwegian Climate and Pollution Agency (KLIF): The regulation of pollutants related to energy production, or other factors affecting the chemical composition of watercourses.
- Directorate for Cultural Heritage (RA): the cultural landscape and provides for hearing comments on hydropower projects.

==== International level ====
- The Norwegian Water Resources and Energy Directorate (NVE) provide the license for the Nord Pool Spot to organise and operate a market place for trading power. The Norwegian Ministry of Petroleum and Energy (MoPE) to facilitate the power market with foreign countries.
- Norway has been in negotiations with the EU commission to agree on a national target for the EU Renewable Energy Source (RES) directive. A draft has been produced giving Norway a target of 67.5% by 2020. This is higher than any other country in the EU.
- Norway's commitment to this regulation was one of the principles required by Sweden for the joint certificate scheme.
- "Norway and Sweden signed a protocol on the fundamental principles and the further follow-up of the common green certificate scheme. At the same time, a proposal for a Norwegian act on the system – reflecting the current Swedish legislation and the protocol, was forwarded to a public consultation. In April 2011, the Government put forward a proposal for a law based on the consultation. The law is expected to be adopted by the Parliament in near future in order to ensure an implementation from January 2012."

==== Participatory governance example ====
- For the implementation of large hydropower plants in Norway numerous stakeholders need to be consulted:
- NVE conducts the initial assessment, consider the need for impact assessments, and coordinate different inputs and viewpoints received through the public consultations.
- The NVE forwards a recommendation to the MoPE.
- MoPE then prepares the case for the Government.
- The Government presents the application to the King in Council. In Norway, the King must sign all the Government's decisions before they can be implemented.

==== Criticisms of Governance ====
- Using horizontal structures can create a lack of responsibility, and this can lead to a lack of co-ordination.
- Governance can include too many stakeholders, which can prevent the network from functioning efficiently.
- Identifying the relevant stakeholders for participatory processes is complex, as certain stakeholder groups may have been excluded from previous decisions.
- There is no definitive concept, or precise usage, of 'governance'; consequently this makes it difficult to create a structure to the network, as there is no easily identifiable framework to follow.

== See also ==
- Hydropower policy in the United States
- Hydropower in China
- Hydropower in Russia
- Hydropower in Colombia
