= Bentwisch =

- Municipality
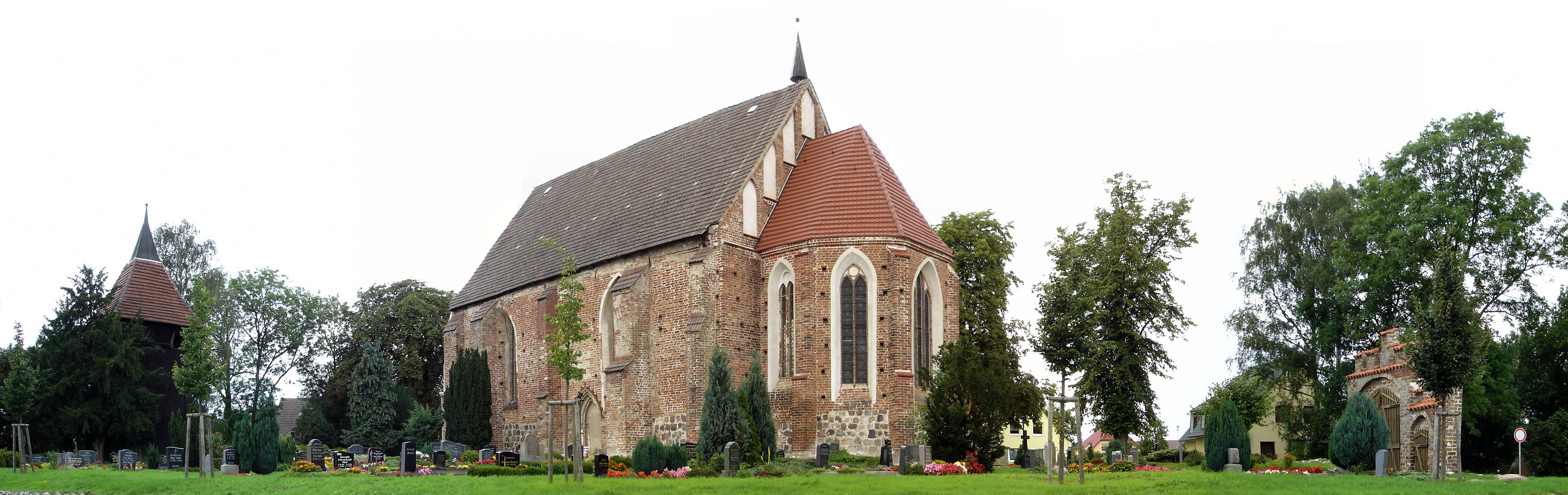
- Church in Bentwisch

- Coat of arms

- Location of Bentwisch within Rostock district
- Interactive map of Bentwisch
- Location within Germany Location within Mecklenburg-Vorpommern
- Coordinates: 54°06′N 12°12′E
- Country: Germany
- State: Mecklenburg-Vorpommern
- District: Rostock
- Municipal assoc.: Rostocker Heide

Government
  - Mayor: Andreas Krüger

Area
  - Total: 29.19 km^{2} (11.27 sq mi)
- Elevation: 15 m (49 ft)

Population (2025-12-31)
  - Total: 3,585
  - Density: 122.8/km^{2} (318.1/sq mi)
- Time zone: UTC+01:00 (CET)
  - Summer (DST): UTC+02:00 (CEST)
- Postal codes: 18182
- Dialling codes: 0381
- Vehicle registration: LRO
- Website: www.amt-rostocker-heide.de

Bentwisch is a municipality in the Rostock district, in Mecklenburg-Vorpommern, Germany, to the east of Rostock. Since its merger with Klein Kussewitz in January 2018, the municipality has 3,174 inhabitants and covers 29.19 square kilometres. Due to its proximity to Rostock, the B 105, and the A 19, Bentwisch became a place of industry after German reunification.

Bentwisch has a substation for 220 kV/110kV and the static inverter plant of the HVDC Kontek. Both facilities are a few kilometres away from each other. In 2002 the static inverter plant Bentwisch was enlarged by a substion for 380 kV/110kV and between the static invertor plant and the 220 kV/110 kV-substation, which was built in difference to the static invertor plant at times, East Germany existed, a 110 kV powerline for 3 phase AC was built.

== People ==
- Emanuel Hirsch
