= Energinet =

Danish energy company

- Type: Government-owned corporation
- Industry: Energy
- Genre: Transmission system operator
- Predecessor: Eltra, Elkraft System, Elkraft Transmission, Gastra
- Founded: 2005
- Headquarters: Erritsø, Denmark
- Key people: Peder Østermark Andreasen (CEO)
- Services: Power and natural gas transmission
- Revenue: 9.17B DKK (2009)
- Owner: Government of Denmark (State ownership)
- Number of employees: 1150
- Subsidiaries: Eltransmission.dk A/S; Gastransmission.dk A/S
- Website: en.energinet.dk

Energinet is the Danish national transmission system operator for electricity and natural gas. It is an independent public enterprise owned by the Danish state under the Ministry of Climate and Energy. Energinet has some 1150 employees, and its headquarters are located in Erritsø near Fredericia in Jutland. The gas division is located in Ballerup near Copenhagen.

The main tasks are to ensure efficient operation and development of the national electricity and gas infrastructure as well as ensuring equal access for all users of the infrastructure.

== History ==
Energinet was created by a merger of power grid operators Eltra, Elkraft System and Elkraft Transmission, and by natural gas transmission system operator Gastra. The merger took place on 24 August 2005 with retrospective effect from 1 January 2005.

Eltra owned the electricity transmission network west of the Great Belt and was system operator there. It was owned by 44 network companies there. To the east of the Great Belt there were two companies: the system operator Elkraft System and the transmission network company Elkraft Transmission. They formed a joint organization and were owned by NESANET A/S, KE Forsyningen, SEAS Transmission A/S, NVE Net A/S, Frederiksberg Elnet A/S, Hillerød Elforsyning, Helsingør Elforsyning, Roskilde Netvirksomhed, Nykøbing Sjællands El-Net and SK-Net A/S.

== Operations ==
External image
- High voltage grid of Denmark

Energinet operates the 400 kV electricity transmission grid and the gas transmission grid. The company owns and operates also 132 kV and 150 kV power grids ("Regionale Net") and the HVDC Great Belt Power Link, and it is a co-owner of the power interconnections with Sweden (Konti–Skan), Norway (Cross-Skagerrak) and Germany (Kontek). A 700MW submarine power cable called COBRAcable to the Netherlands is planned with TenneT, and a 1,400MW cable (Viking Link in 2022) to Britain is investigated with National Grid, expected to cost DKK 15 billion. Cobra and Viking were put on the EU "Projects of Common Interest" list in November 2015, along with the Krieger offshore wind turbine cable to Germany. Of the high voltage power lines on land, 25% were laid as underground cables in 2014.

Energinet has a 20% stake in Nord Pool Spot AS (the largest electricity market in the world), and, as of December 2012, 100% of the physical gas exchange Nord Pool Gas A/S. It also owns a fiber-optic communication network and a gas storage facility, as well as a 20% stake in European Market Coupling Company, a Central-West European cross-border electrical power trading joint venture due to begin operations on 9 November 2010.

An electrical consumption support scheme dedicated to sustainable electricity producers in Denmark is administered by Energinet.

== See also ==
- Electricity sector in Denmark
- Energy in Denmark
