= Baltic Cable =

HVDC power line between Sweden and Germany

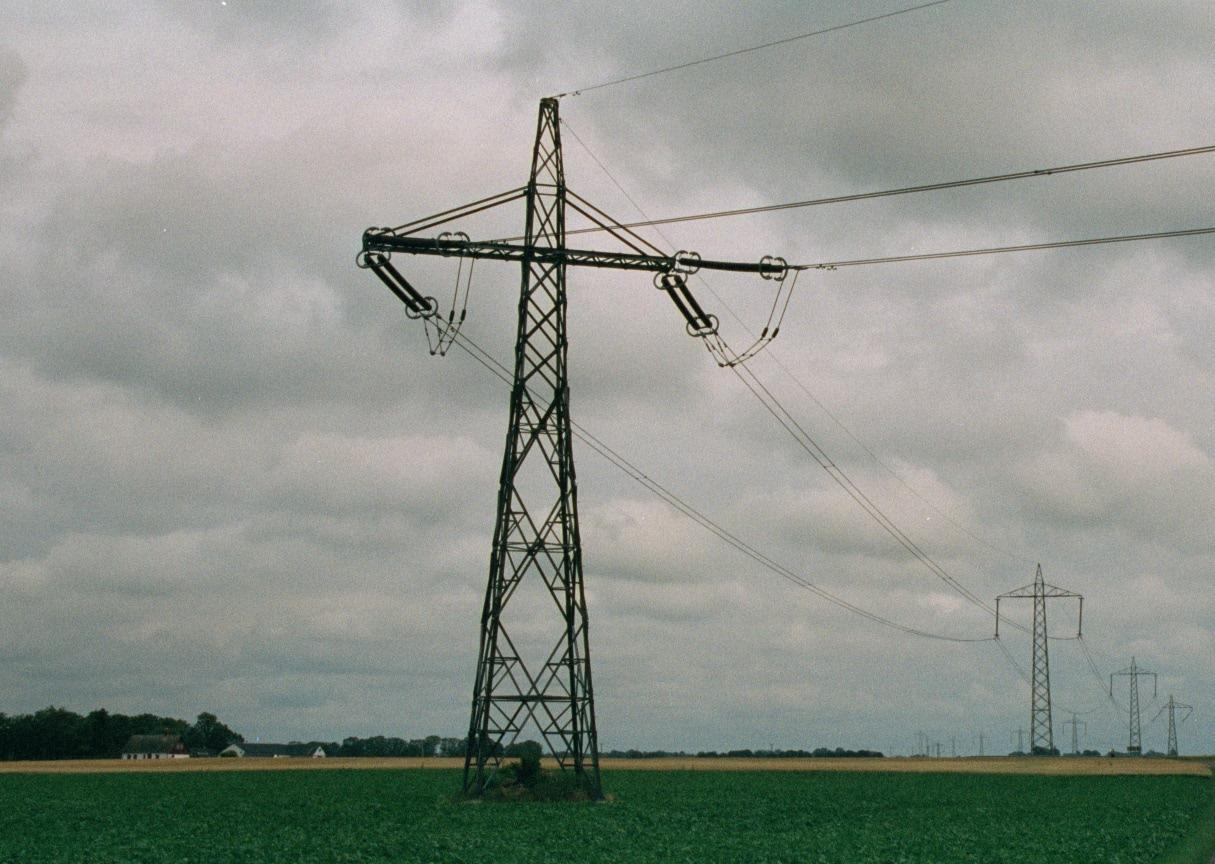
- Pylons of the Baltic Cable HVDC in Sweden
- Location of Baltic Cable

Location
- Country: Sweden, Germany
- Coordinates: 53°53′45.8″N 10°48′08.7″E; 55°25′27″N 13°03′43.3″E; 55°25′50.1″N 13°3′12″E; 55°27′8.1″N 13°2′56.2″E; 55°28′33.3″N 13°04′02.2″E; 55°28′38.5″N 13°04′49.1″E; 55°28′59.4″N 13°06′15.2″E; 55°29′9.6″N 13°07′12.6″E; 55°29′29.7″N 13°8′18.3″E; 55°29′52″N 13°08′33.6″E; 55°30′01.1″N 13°08′45″E
- From: Lübeck-Herrenwyk
- To: Arrie

Ownership information
- Owner: Statkraft Energi AS
- Operator: Baltic Cable AB

Construction information
- Cable manufacturer: ABB
- Substation manufacturer: ABB
- Commissioned: 1994

Technical information
- Type: submarine cable / overhead line
- Current type: HVDC
- Total length: 262 km (163 mi)
- No. of towers: 40
- Capacity: 600 MW
- AC voltage: 380 kV
- DC voltage: 450 kV
- No. of poles: 1
- No. of circuits: 1

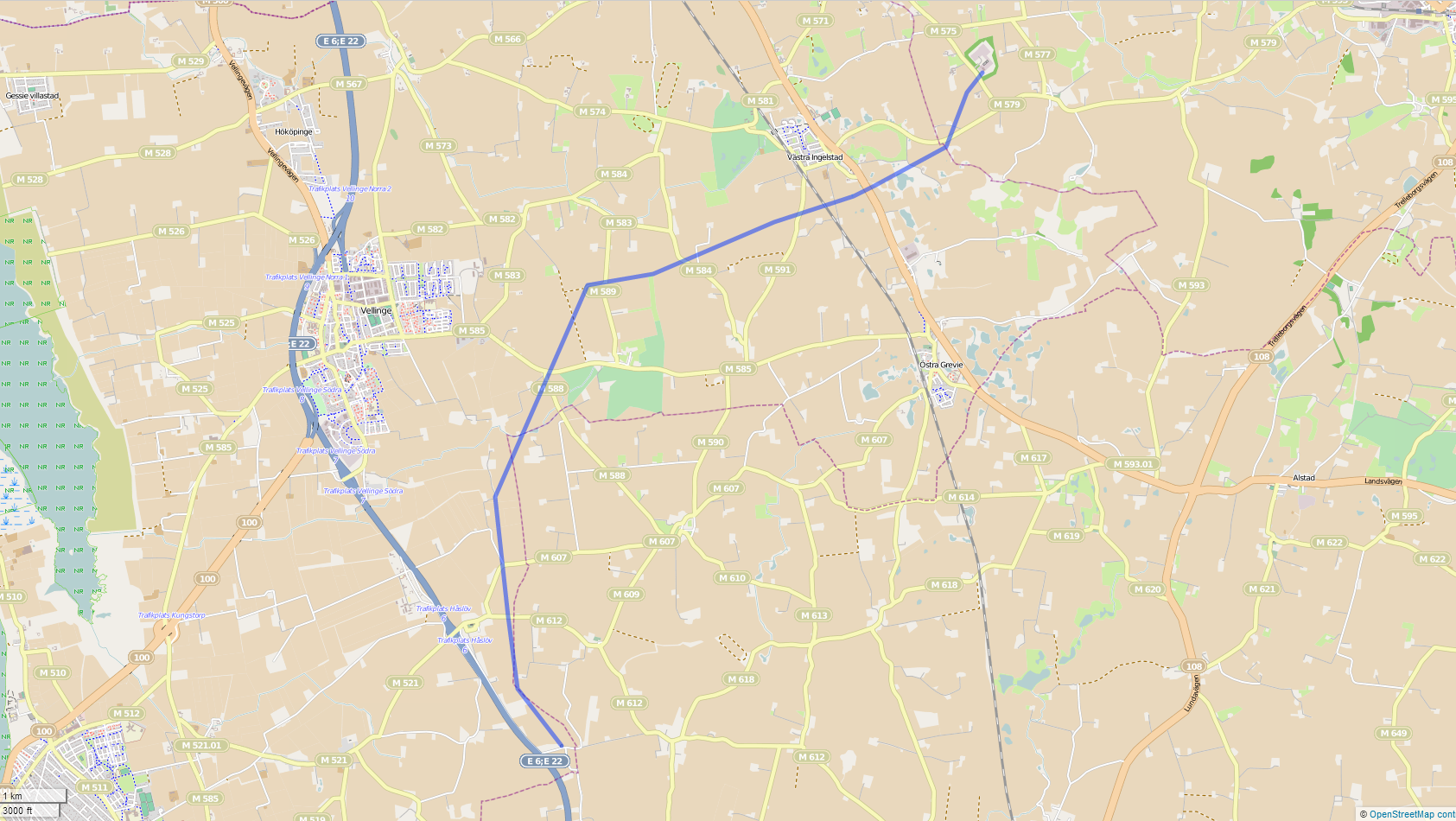
Track of the overhead line section of Baltic Cable in Sweden

The Baltic Cable is a monopolar HVDC power line running beneath the Baltic Sea that interconnects the electric power grids of Germany and Sweden. Its maximum transmission power is 600 megawatts (MW).

The Baltic Cable uses a transmission voltage of 450 kV – the highest operating voltage for energy transmission in Germany. The total project cost was 2 billion SEK (US$280 million), and the link was put into operation in December 1994. With a length of 250 kilometres (160 mi), it was the second longest high voltage undersea cable on earth, until Basslink came into service in 2006.

== Route ==
The Baltic Cable is the only interconnector between the price zones Germany/Luxemburg (DE/LU) and Sweden 4 (SE4) and starts in Germany at the converter station at Lübeck-Herrenwyk, which is on the site of a former coal-fired power station, It crosses the river Trave in a channel 6 metres (20 ft) below the bottom of the river and then follows its course as sea cable laid at the eastern side of the river. After crossing the Priwall Peninsula the cable runs parallel to the coast of Mecklenburg-Vorpommern, before turning north-easterly toward Sweden. At sea, it crosses the submarine cable of HVDC Kontek. This is the only crossing of two submarine HVDC cables in the Baltic Sea and one of the only few worldwide.

From the landing point at the southern coast of Sweden, the powerline transitions to an overhead line a few kilometres inland. It runs to a termination tower in Kruseberg which is attached to a 400 kV/130 kV substation of the Swedish power grid.

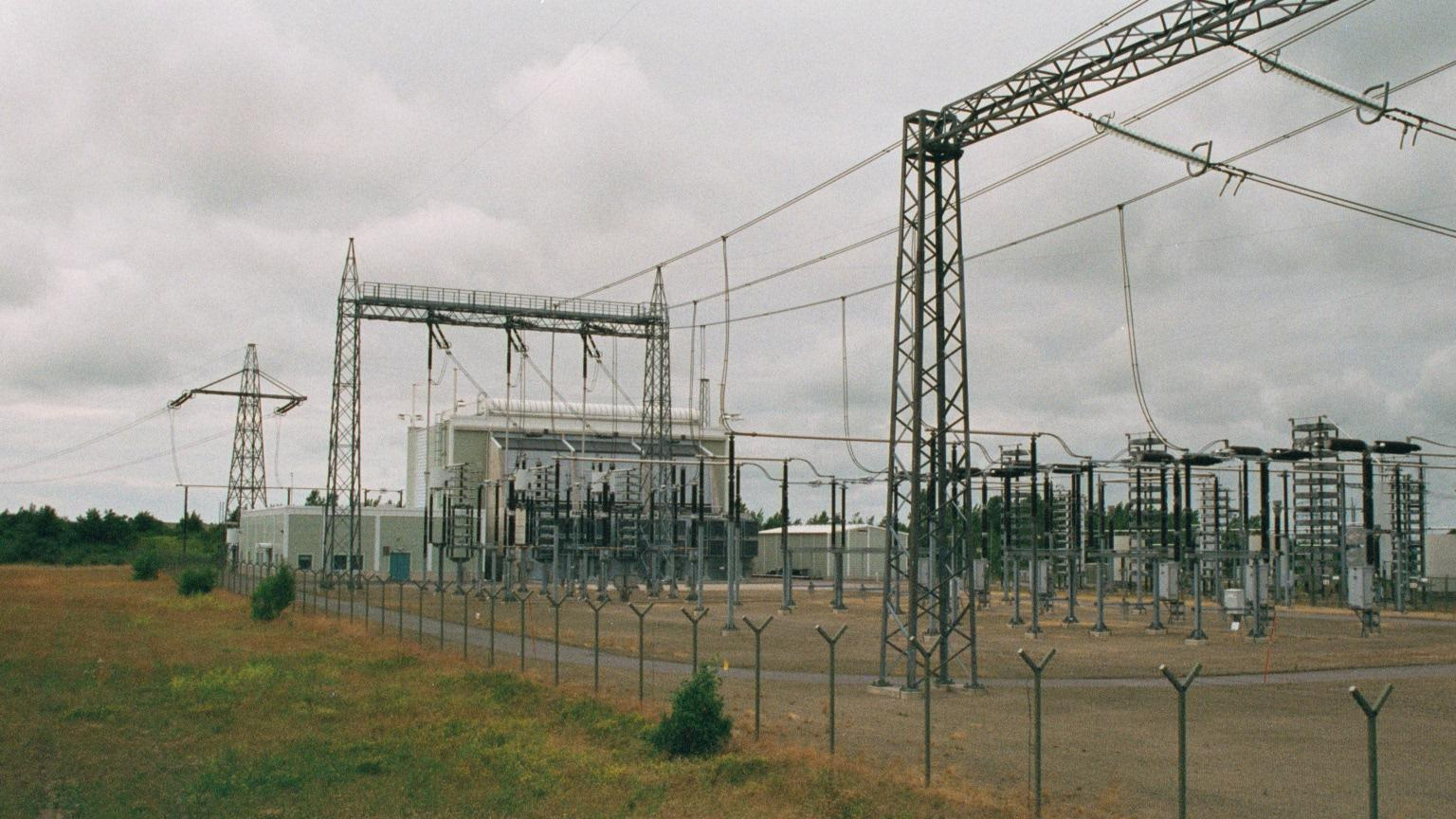
Kruseberg converter station on the Swedish side of the Baltic Cable HVDC interconnection

The anode, which is situated in the Baltic Sea, consists of 40 titanium nets each with a surface of 20 m^{2}, which are laid on the sea bottom under plastic tubes and stones. It is connected to Kruseberg converter station with a 23-kilometre-long underground and submarine power line, which consists of two parallel-connected cables with 630 mm^{2} cross section.

The cathode is situated in the Baltic Sea north of Elmenhorst. It consists of a bare copper ring with a 2-kilometre diameter. It is connected to the static inverter plant in Lübeck-Herrenwyk with a 32-kilometre-long cable. The first 20 kilometres of this cable have a cross section of 1400 mm^{2} and the last of 800 mm^{2}. This cable is laid in the tunnel under Trave River at a distance of 2.5 metres from the high voltage cable. The separation reduces the magnetic field, which may affect compasses of vessels in this highly frequented area. As the cable is a monopolar line, it produces much higher magnetic fields than bipolar cables with the same ratings.

== Operation ==
Because this overhead line can generate radio interference, there is a highly effective active filter system installed at the Kruseberg converter station. In the Lübeck-Herrenwyk converter station, there is no requirement for such a system, because there is no overhead powerline section on the German side.

The cable cannot be operated at the maximum transmission rating of 600 megawatts, because the 380 kV line which begins at the converter station of Lübeck-Herrenwyk ends at the Lübeck-Siems substation. This is the only 380 kV powerline in Germany which has no direct connection to the Central European 380 kV grid, which caused the Baltic Cable to have a 372 megawatt (MW) capacity instead of 600 MW. This bottleneck was solved in 2004 when an additional 220 kV line was built. However power flows on 220 kV and 110 kV lines face increased losses of the transmission.

In the area of the converter station there is also a 110 kV/220 kV sub-station, fed by two 110 kV circuits from the Lübeck-Siems sub-station. There is no transformer for coupling the 380 kV- and the 110 kV-grid in the area of the Lübeck-Herrenwyk converter station.

In 2016, the owner Statkraft started a court case against Swedish authorities in disagreements over profits from electricity trade in the cable.

In the night from April 16, 2016 to April 17, 2016 on the electrode cable on Priwall peninsula a fault occurred, which resulted in the generation of hydrogen at the fault location as it acted as cathode. The hydrogen got ignited by the generated heat and a 3 metres high flame shot off the ground. As there is no device monitoring the state of the electrode cable, no alert was made to the operators. Fire brigades were first not able to extinguish the fire, but the flame went out when the current was switched off.

== Expansion schemes ==
Of the two originally planned 380 kV lines to Lübeck (from Krümmel Nuclear Power Plant to Lübeck-Siems and from Schwerin substation to Lübeck-Herrenwyk), the 380 kV line between Krümmel and Lübeck-Siems was canceled according to speakers from E.ON AG.

There is still the option to build a 380 kV line from Lübeck to another 380 kV substation in Schleswig-Holstein, Hamburg or Lower Saxony. The construction of the 380 kV link between Lübeck-Herrenwyk and Schwerin is not progressing due to opposition from ecologists.

== See also ==
- Electricity sector in Sweden
- List of high-voltage transmission links in Sweden
- Estlink, cable between Estonia and Finland
- LitPol Link, cable between Lithuania and Poland
