= Konti–Skan =

Submarine HVDC power line between Sweden and Denmark

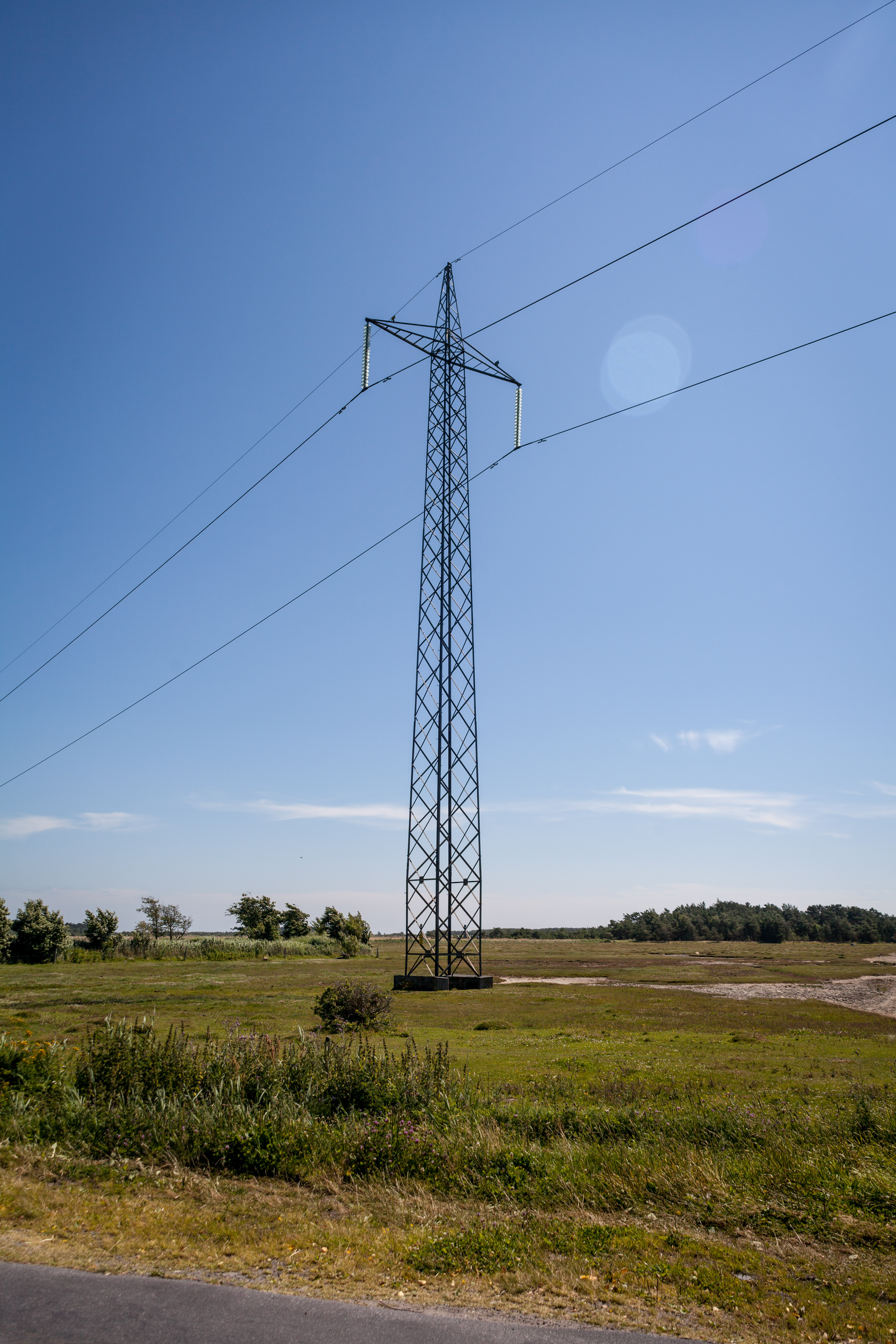
- Konti-Skan pylon on Læsø
- Location of Konti–Skan

Location
- Country: Denmark, Sweden
- Coordinates: 57°03′46″N 10°05′24″E; 57°14′01″N 10°32′29″E; 57°10′35″N 10°26′59″E; 57°15′08″N 10°54′13″E; 57°18′32″N 11°07′35″E; 57°34′11″N 11°58′27″E; 57°33′6″N 11°59′17″E; 57°34′27″N 12°0′5″E; 57°36′38″N 12°6′25″E; 57°36′24″N 12°6′40″E; 57°48′15″N 12°19′13″E
- General direction: south–north–south (bidirectional)
- From: Vester Hassing (near Aalborg, Denmark)
- Passes through: Kattegatt
- To: Lindome (Sweden)

Ownership information
- Partners: Energinet.dk; Svenska Kraftnät

Construction information
- Cable manufacturer: ABB
- Commissioned: 1965 (Kontiskan 1); 1988 (Kontiskan 2)
- Decommissioned: 2006 (Kontiskan 1)

Technical information
- Type: submarine cable
- Current type: HVDC
- Total length: 149 km (93 mi)
- Capacity: 250 MW (Kontiskan 1); 300 MW (Kontiskan 2)
- AC voltage: 130/150 kV (Kontiskan 1); 400 kV (Kontiskan 2; both ends)
- DC voltage: 250 kV (Kontiskan 1); 300 kV (Kontiskan 2)
- No. of poles: 1

Konti–Skan (also known as Kontiskan) is the name of high-voltage direct-current transmission line between Denmark (DK1) and Sweden (SE3).

== Technical description ==
Kontiskan is a bipolar HVDC scheme. Pole 1 (Kontiskan 1) was originally built in 1965, using mercury arc valves and was able to transmit up to 250 megawatts (MW) of power with an operating voltage of 250 kV. The original mercury arc scheme was taken out of operation and disconnected on 15 August 2006, being replaced by new equipment using thyristors with a power rating of 350 MW. Pole 2, the 1988-built Kontiskan 2, was built with thyristors from the outset and can transmit 300 MW with a voltage of 285 kV.

== Route ==
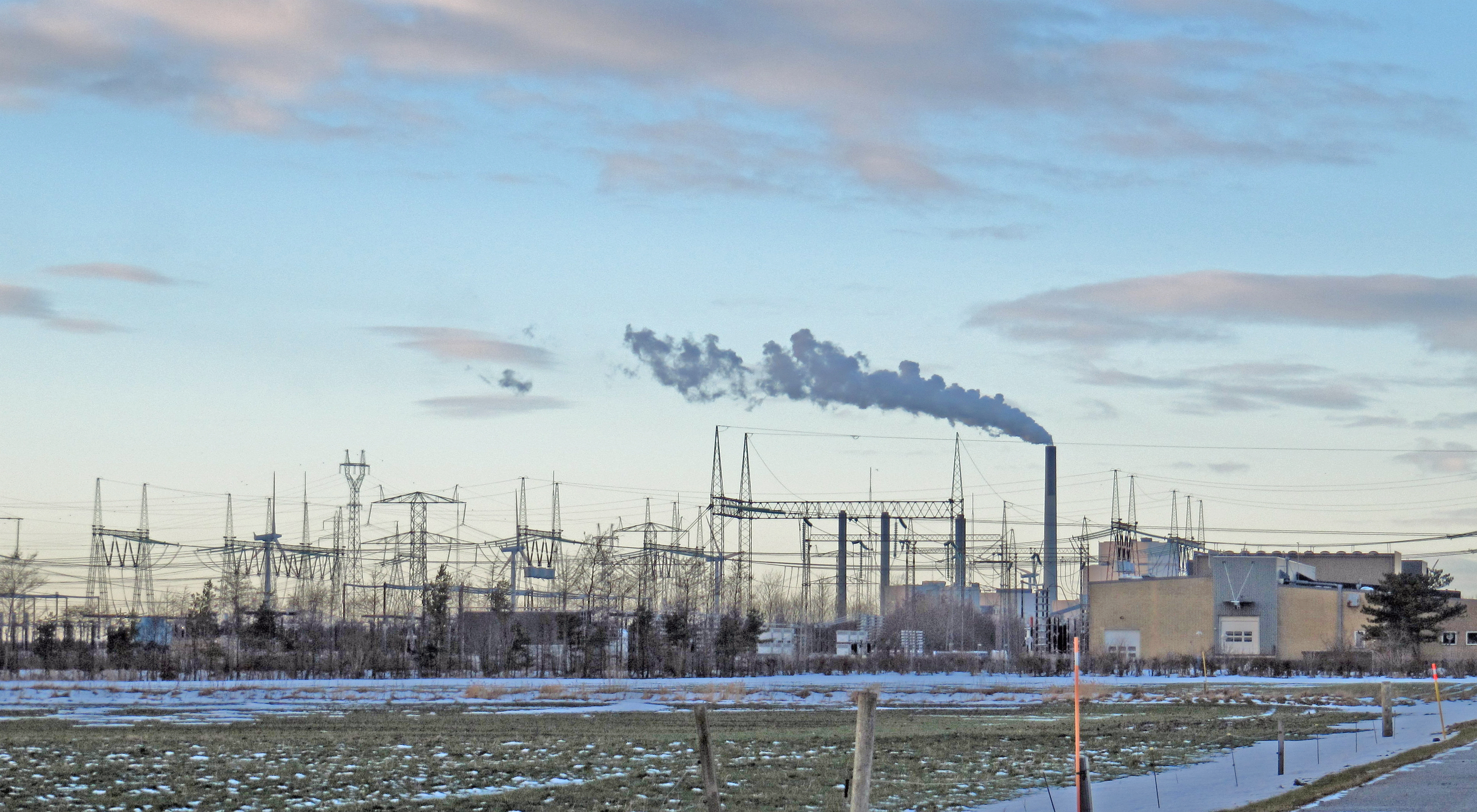
Vester Hassing converter station in Denmark

On the Danish side, the converter station used as well by Konti–Skan 1 and 2 is close to Vester Hassing near Aalborg.

- From Vester Hassing a 34 kilometres (21 mi) long overhead line with two conductors runs to the cable terminal at the Danish coast near Stensnæs. This line, which is only in the proximity of the converter station and the cable terminal equipped with a ground conductor, was originally used by the high voltage pole of Konti–Skan 1 and from Vester Hassing until a point a few kilometres south of the cable terminal by the electrode line, which turned there eastwards to the ground electrode at Soera.
- At implementation of Konti–Skan 2 the whole overhead electrode line was replaced by two 27 kilometres (17 mi) long underground cables and the second conductor of the overhead line got the high-voltage pole of Konti–Skan 2.
- The 23 kilometres (14 mi) long submarine cable to the Danish island of Læsø starts at Stensnæs and consists of 3 parallel cables. Each of these cables has two copper conductors with a copper cross section of 310 square millimeters. One of these cables was used by Kontiskan 1 and one is used by Kontiskan 2.
- From the third cable, one conductor was used by Kontiskan 1 and the other is used by Kontiskan 2. Konti–Skan crosses Læsø on a 17 kilometres (11 mi) long overhead line with two conductors.
- Before the implementation of Konti–Skan 2 both conductors were switched parallel, today one conductor is used for the high voltage pole of Konti–Skan 1, while the other is used for that of Konti–Skan 2.
- Between Læsø and Sweden each high voltage pole of Konti–Skan uses a monopolar copper cable with a cross section of 1200 square millimetres.

On the Swedish side, a 38 kilometres (24 mi) long overhead power line ran to the original converter station of Konti–Skan 1 near Stenkullen.

- On the first 9 kilometres (5.6 mi) of this line the pylons carry the high-voltage conductors of Kontiskan 1 and 2.
- East of Brännemysten they carry also the conductor of the electrode line like a ground conductor on the pinnacle, but of course insulated to the structure of the pylons.
- It comes from the common grounding electrode of Kontiskan 1 and 2 near Risø in the Baltic Sea and runs after a submarine/underground cable section ending at a cable terminal near Brattas northwards as pole line to the high voltage pole line of Konti–Skan at Brännemysten.
- The Swedish converters of Kontiskan were originally situated at different places: that of Kontiskan 1 originally at Stenkullen, east of Gothenburg and that of Kontiskan 2 and the thyristor replacement of Kontiskan 1 near Lindome south of Gothenburg and south of the route of Kontiskan 1.
- The last 30 kilometres (19 mi) of Konti–Skan 1 were installed on guyed aluminum framework pylons with an unusually low weight of only 800 kilograms.
- These pylons carried 2 conductors, the high-voltage pole and the electrode line of Konti–Skan 1 on insulators of equal length. The remaining parts of this power line were dismantled in 2012.

Shortly before the end of the line to Stenkullen, the line shared two pylons with the three-phase AC line from Stenkullen to Holmbokullen. Apart from the pylons at the terminal of HVDC Volgograd-Donbass at Volga-Hydroelectric Power Plant, these were the only pylons carrying AC and DC circuits.

== Sites ==
Site	Coordinates
Vester Hassing HVDC Static Inverter	57°03′46″N 10°05′24″E
Stae Ground Conductor Terminus	57°05′08″N 10°06′50″E
Lyngsa Ground Conductor Terminus	57°13′40″N 10°30′01″E
Lyngsa Cable Terminal (Jutland)	57°14′01″N 10°32′29″E
Nørre Sørå Grounding Electrode (Jutland)	57°10′35″N 10°26′59″E
Tusholm Cable Terminal (Læsø)	57°15′08″N 10°54′13″E
Osterby Cable Terminal (Læsø)	57°18′32″N 11°07′35″E
Ambjörnhagen Cable Terminal (Sweden)	57°34′11″N 11°58′27″E
Brattas Overhead Electrode Line Terminal (Sweden)	57°33′6″N 11°59′17″E
Brännemysten Konti–Skan Electrode Line Branch	57°34′27″N 12°0′5″E
Lindome Konti–Skan Branch Tower	57°36′38″N 12°6′25″E
Lindome HVDC Static Inverter	57°36′24″N 12°6′40″E
Stenkullen HVDC Static Inverter	57°48′15″N 12°19′13″E

== Waypoints ==
List of waypoints

Overhead Line in Denmark

- 57.062679°N 10.092321°E
- 57.0676226°N 10.0980663°E
- 57.0854722°N 10.1138431°E
- 57.1088953°N 10.1603258°E
- 57.1131773°N 10.1688337°E
- 57.1445754°N 10.2912712°E
- 57.1607764°N 10.3178895°E
- 57.1863962°N 10.4040205°E
- 57.1923202°N 10.4154146°E
- 57.216611°N 10.4623049°E
- 57.2278793°N 10.5002367°E
- 57.2338025°N 10.541532°E

Overhead Line on Læsø

- 57.252389°N 10.903703°E
- 57.2435475°N 10.9929907°E
- 57.2482667°N 11.0356379°E
- 57.2497961°N 11.0397577°E
- 57.2591279°N 11.0502613°E
- 57.2874742°N 11.0653031°E
- 57.2968602°N 11.079711°E
- 57.3089558°N 11.126554°E

Overhead Line from Swedish Coast to Lindome

- 57.569804°N 11.9744271°E
- 57.5742441°N 12.0015764°E
- 57.5762115°N 12.0189464°E
- 57.5796168°N 12.0350397°E
- 57.5829529°N 12.0460474°E
- 57.5853109°N 12.0567119°E
- 57.5872662°N 12.0603436°E
- 57.5890317°N 12.0618886°E
- 57.5902436°N 12.064316°E
- 57.5948508°N 12.0793605°E
- 57.5989212°N 12.0851326°E
- 57.6000135°N 12.0879328°E
- 57.6018387°N 12.0907438°E
- 57.610686°N 12.1069336°E
- 57.6089202°N 12.1095836°E
- 57.6079661°N 12.1109354°E

Overhead Line Lindome-Stenkullen

- 57.610686°N 12.1069336°E
- 57.6192899°N 12.1245503°E
- 57.6264182°N 12.1478239°E
- 57.6294527°N 12.1601272°E
- 57.6318652°N 12.16694°E
- 57.6331948°N 12.1727926°E
- 57.6345962°N 12.1753246°E
- 57.6372409°N 12.1769124°E
- 57.6408085°N 12.1812442°E
- 57.6471274°N 12.1982253°E
- 57.6550238°N 12.2123069°E
- 57.6739081°N 12.2388983°E
- 57.6795085°N 12.26071°E
- 57.6860544°N 12.2721148°E
- 57.6892659°N 12.2743624°E
- 57.6916916°N 12.2744617°E
- 57.6939795°N 12.2776642°E
- 57.6937459°N 12.280561°E
- 57.6995353°N 12.2899568°E
- 57.7008739°N 12.2943932°E
- 57.7058898°N 12.3018551°E
- 57.7149711°N 12.3086679°E
- 57.7593661°N 12.3113447°E
- 57.7734534°N 12.3244232°E
- 57.7781074°N 12.3257965°E
- 57.7799093°N 12.3279101°E
- 57.7818857°N 12.3287576°E
- 57.7873336°N 12.3252118°E
- 57.7896054°N 12.3252681°E
- 57.7964788°N 12.3234656°E
- 57.79873°N 12.3213762°E
- 57.7987272°N 12.3213708°E
- 57.8004795°N 12.3189434°E
- 57.8022689°N 12.3164034°E
- 57.8036609°N 12.3185545°E

Electrode Line in Sweden

- 57.5518607°N 11.9882445°E
- 57.5531407°N 11.9890532°E
- 57.5545869°N 11.9932964°E
- 57.5579339°N 11.9958365°E
- 57.5646945°N 11.9978133°E
- 57.5667674°N 11.9994628°E
- 57.569863°N 12.0007744°E
- 57.5737105°N 12.0017722°E
- 57.5742441°N 12.0015764°E

== See also ==
- List of high-voltage transmission links in Denmark
- List of high-voltage transmission links in Sweden
- Estlink, cable between Estonia and Finland
- LitPol Link, cable between Lithuania and Poland
