= Climate change in Sweden =

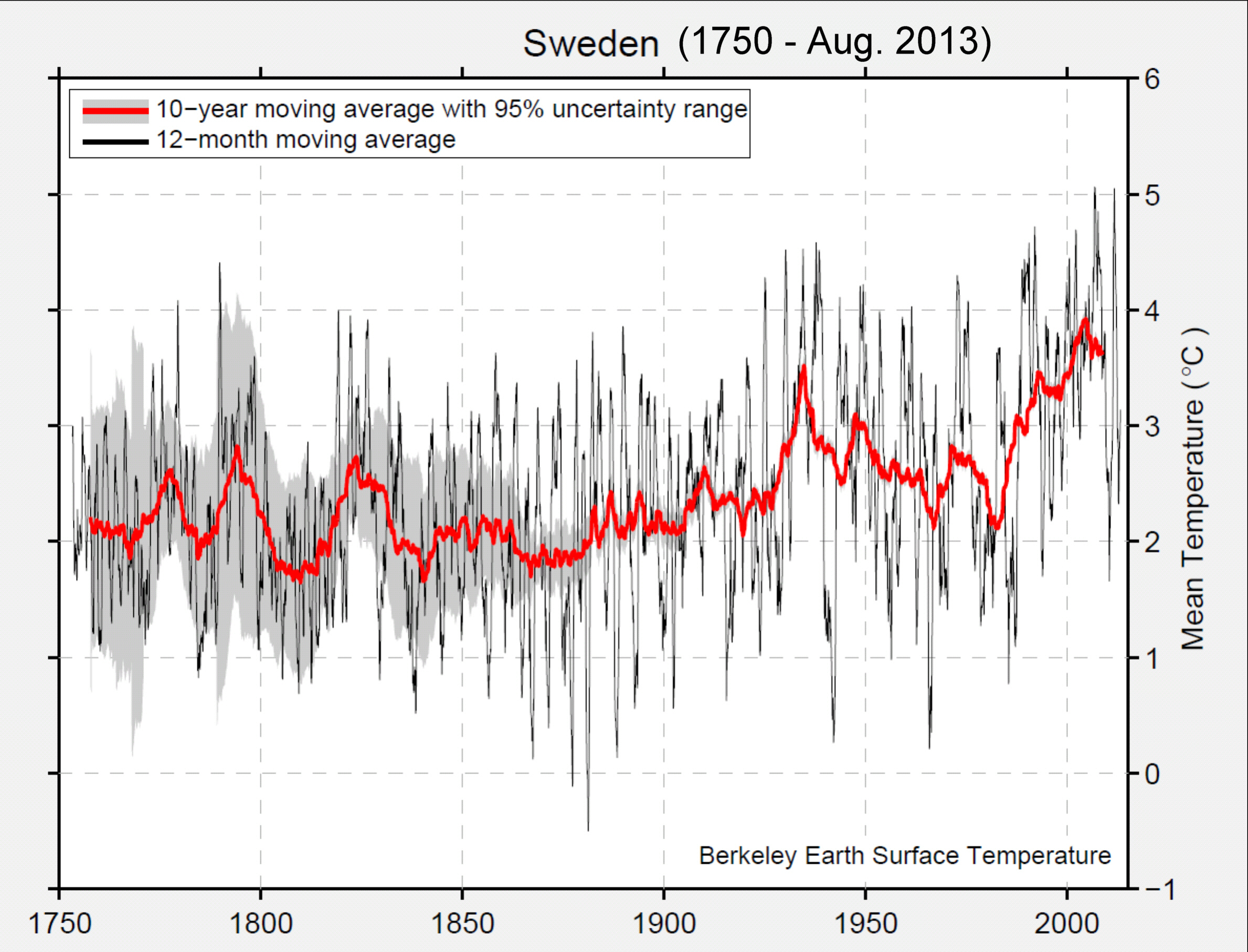
Temperature rise in Sweden's climate (1750–2013)

Climate change has received significant scientific, public and political attention in Sweden. In 1896, Swedish chemist Svante Arrhenius was the first scientist to quantify global heating. Sweden has a high energy consumption per capita, but reducing the dependency on fossil energy has been on the agenda of cabinets of the Governments of Sweden since the 1970s oil crises. In 2014 and 2016, Sweden was ranked #1 in the Global Green Economy Index (GGEI), because the Swedish economy produces relatively low emissions. Sweden has had one of the highest usages of biofuel in Europe and aims at prohibiting new sales of fossil-cars, including hybrid cars, by 2035, and for an energy supply system with zero net atmospheric greenhouse gas emissions by 2045.

Since the end of the 19th century, the average annual temperature has risen by almost two degrees Celsius, compared to global warming of just over one degree. Sweden's winter temperature is predicted to further increase by as much as 7 °C (13 °F) by 2100 in a worst-case scenario. This will increase the percentage of precipitation that comes from rain instead of snow. The Baltic Sea could see a surface water temperature increase of up to 4 °C (7 °F). This will decrease sea ice cover by the end of the century.

The Swedish Civil Contingencies Agency (MSB) produces guidelines and resources to help citizens adapt to climate change. The MSB keeps flood and landslide maps online, and guidelines for decision-making in case of disasters.

Governmental efforts include policy instruments and legislation to mitigate and adapt to climate change. Policy instruments include taxing carbon dioxide emissions, issuing renewable energy certificates, subsidizing renewable energy initiatives, and making investments in R&D.

== Greenhouse gas emissions ==
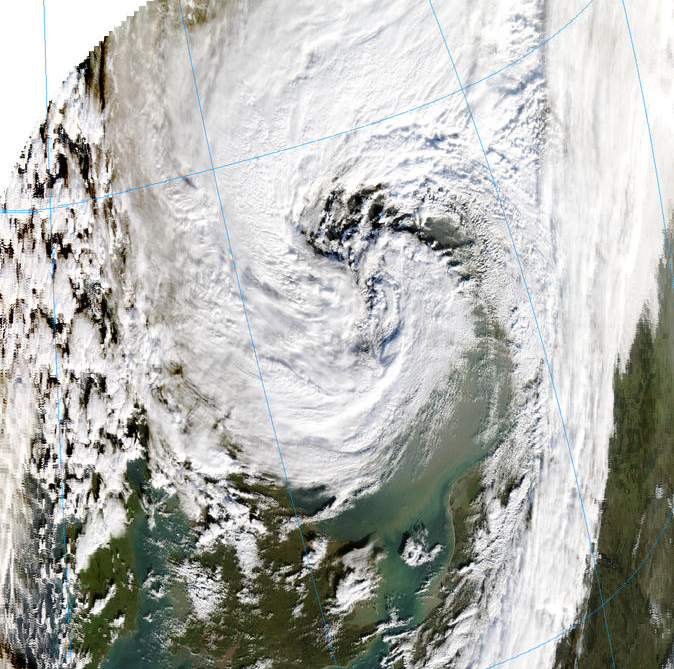
Cyclone Gudrun in the North Sea 8 January 2005

Regarding greenhouse gas emission as a whole, the country has 4 targets: from the level of 1990, emissions should be reduced by 40% by the year 2020, by 63% by the year 2030, achieve net zero emissions by 2045, and reach negative emissions after this year.

In 2020, 2 years before it was planned to be done, Sweden closed its last coal fired power station and became coal free, the third country in Europe after Belgium and Austria. As of 2018, 54% of energy came from renewable sources. The country has a target to achieve 100% electricity from renewables by 2040.

In 2019 Sweden placed number four in the Climate Change Performance Index by Germanwatch with 76.28 points out of 100. No country was granted position one to three in the list as "No country is doing enough to prevent dangerous climate change.” Sweden ranked first in both the 2014 and 2016 editions of the Global Green Economy Index (GGEI) where Sweden performs well overall and within the topic of climate change performance where it is one of the top developed countries due to the relatively low emissions intensity of the Swedish economy.

The following table shows the yearly total emission of greenhouse gas in Sweden in million tonnes of carbon dioxide equivalent (Mt CO_{2}). Values for EU28 and world to compare trends.

Year	Sweden (Mt CO_{2})	EU28 (Mt CO_{2})	World (Mt CO_{2})
1970	119	5 507	24 305
1980	104	6 214	29 989
1990	81	5 744	32 772
2000	81	5 297	35 962
2010	79	4 957	45 934
2015	67	4 500	49 113

The following table shows the yearly emission of greenhouse gas in Sweden in tonnes of carbon dioxide equivalent per capita (t CO_{2}/capita).

Year	Sweden (t CO_{2}/capita)	EU28 (t CO_{2}/capita)	World (t CO_{2}/capita)
1970	14.7	12.5	6.6
1980	12.5	13.4	6.7
1990	9.5	12.0	6.2
2000	9.1	10.9	5.9
2010	8.4	9.8	6.6
2015	6.9	8.9	6.7

For the total carbon dioxide emissions in 2009, without other Greenhouse gases or land use, at 50.56 million tonnes Sweden ranked in place 60 out of 216 countries, below Libya 55.0 million tonnes, Serbia 52.3 million tonnes and Finland 52.15 million tonnes. For the per capita carbon dioxide emissions in 2009, at 5.58 tonnes per capita (t/capita), Sweden ranked shared place 82 out of 216 countries having the same emissions as Ukraine. This was only slightly below the carbon dioxide emissions per capita in China 5.83 t/capita.

In 2000, Sweden ranked in place 76 out of 185 countries for the per capita greenhouse gas emissions when taking any land use changes into account. Without considering land use changes the country ranked at fifty eighth.

Climate gas emission in 2018 of public workers in Sweden was 410,000 tonnes (196,000 workers, ca 2 tonnes pro person). Naturvardsverket encourage to reduce the annual emissions in public sector. In 2019 nine first months Karolinska institutet have reduced 5% all air travels and 18% Swedish air travels compared to year 2018.

=== Road emissions ===
Share of biofuel increased from 22% to 23% in 2019. Road emissions declined by 2% from 2018 to 2019. To reach transport climate target by 2030 road traffic climate emissions must decline 8% a year (Sven Hunhammar, director in Trafikverket).

=== Aviation emissions ===
According to Swedavia there was 40 million aviation travels in Sweden in 2019. Number decreased 9% in domestic flights and decreased 2% in international flights compared to 2018. Swedish population in August 2019 was ca 10.3 million. This makes approximately in average 3.88 air travels per each citizen in Sweden in 2019.

Swedish aircraft greenhouse gas emissions equaled those of Swedish personal car traffic in 2017 according to the Swedish Environmental Protection Agency and a Chalmers University study published 31 May 2019. Total emissions in 2017 was one tonne carbon dioxide equivalent per Swedish person. This is five times the global average.

According to Swedish TV news, the Swedish government supports taxing aviation equal to private car traffic in 2019. Swedish TV news calculated that tax will make travel to Thailand 8,900 Swedish krona more expensive.

==== Chalmers University report 2019 ====
Global civil aviation accounts for 4–5% of total greenhouse gas emissions and these emissions are increasing. Greenhouse gas emissions from air travel are substantial for high-income countries like Sweden. Chalmers University Gothenburg developed methodology to calculate Swedish aviation emissions.

The climate impact of aviation comes from CO_{2} emissions, emissions of nitrogen oxides above 8000 meters, and the warm aircraft emissions forming ice crystals. Total emissions were estimated by calculating the CO_{2} emissions by 1.9 for international flights, and by 1.4 for domestic flights. Calculation excluded emissions from the production of fuel which is 10-20% in the EU.

The Swedish population's air travel emission based on country of residence was 10 million tonnes CO_{2}eq, in business 20% and in private travel 80%. The amount 10 million tonnes CO_{2}eq can be compared with the bunker fuels metric which showed a total of 3.1 Mt CO_{2}. Emissions were ca 1.1 tonnes CO_{2} equivalents per Swedish capita in 2017 compared to global average 0.2 tonnes per capita.

The Swedish aviation emissions are in total approximately equal to the emissions from the Swedish passenger vehicle traffic. Calculation exclude contribution of the tourists aviation visiting Sweden. Aviation emission was 170 g CO_{2} per passenger kilometre compared to 50 gram per kilometre and person in a car with three passengers.

=== Statistics on "large emitters in Sweden" ===
Listed below, an overview of large emitters of CO_{2} equivalents registered in Sweden in the European Union Emission Trading Scheme (EU ETS). In 2018, the 584 entities registered in Sweden in EU ETS, emitting at least one tonne of CO_{2}e, combined had verified emissions of 22,624,282 tonnes of CO_{2}e. The column "Part of SE sum in EU ETS" is based on this sum, not the total emissions in Sweden.

Large emitters in Sweden.
Emitter	Verified emissions (tonnes of CO_{2}e)	Registered activity	Year	Part of SE sum in EU ETS	Ownership comment
Scandinavian Airlines	2466820	Airline	2018	11%	In early 2018 Danish state owned 14%, Swedish state 15%, Norwegian state 10%. Parts of emissions likely related to activities outside Sweden.
Luleå KVV (CHP)	2120996	Combustion of fuels	2018	9%	Owned to equal share by SSAB and Luleå Municipality.
Slitefabriken	1740412	Production of cement clinker	2018	8%	Owned by HeidelbergCement, through Cementa AB
Preemraff Lysekil	1625082	Refining of mineral oil	2018	7%	Owned by Preem
SSAB Oxelösund	1462246	Production of pig iron or steel	2018	6%	Owned by SSAB. Swedish state owned 2.25% in 2016.
SSAB Luleå	1058183	Production of pig iron or steel	2018	5%	Owned by SSAB. Swedish state owned 2.25% in 2016.
Krackeranläggningen, Borealis	636536	Combustion of fuels	2018	3%	Owned by Borealis
St1 Refinery AB	547101	Refining of mineral oil	2018	2.4%	Owned by St1
Preemraff Göteborg	536000	Refining of mineral oil	2018	2.4%	Owned by Preem
Värtan, Stockholm Exergi	499698	Combustion of fuels	2018	2.2%	Owned to equal share by Stockholm Municipality and Fortum, a Finnish state-owned company.
LKAB Kiruna	436371	Metal ore roasting or sintering	2018	1.9%	Swedish state owned 100% in 2018.

== Impacts on the natural environment ==
By the end of the century, Sweden's climate will be different from today's. There are uncertainties regarding the exact scope of the change, one uncertainty being the world's political trajectory regarding climate policy.

=== Temperature and weather changes ===
Köppen climate classification map for Sweden for 1980–2016

2071–2100 map under the most intense climate change scenario. Mid-range scenarios are currently considered more likely

By the 2080s average temperatures are set to rise by 3–5 °C. The climate in the Mälardalen region will be similar to that of northern France. Winter temperatures are likely to see a greater increase than spring, summer and autumn temperatures. By the end of the century winters could be up to 7 °C warmer than today on average. The Norrland coast will probably be the region that sees the highest increases in temperature. In May 2018 mean temperature was more than in average +5 °C in most Sweden and +2.5 °C in most Europe. In July 2018 mean temperature was more than +3–4 °C on average in most of Sweden. In July 2018 Italy, Norway, Poland and France sent help to fight the dozens of forest fires in Sweden.

==== Precipitation ====
Sweden's future climate is expected to be wetter, with an increase in intense rain events. Most of the increase in precipitation will be during winter and a larger proportion will fall as rain. Summers will be drier and see a reduction in heavy rain events, particularly in the southern parts of Sweden.

==== Wind ====
Climate models differ on whether Sweden's climate will get windier or not. Some models predict an increase in average wind speed, whilst others predict a decrease. The predictions of one climate model able to resolve wind gusts show an increase in the speed of wind gusts in the future.

==== Baltic sea ====
The surface temperature of the Baltic Sea will increase as the air temperature increases. Some models predict up to 4 °C increases in surface water temperature. Sea ice cover is expected to decrease and be localized to the northern Gulf of Bothnia by the end on the century. The salinity of the Baltic Sea is predicted to fall in some climate models as a result of increased influx of freshwater from the mainland, though other models differ significantly with some even showing an increase in salinity.

=== Historical overview ===
Since the beginning of the Quaternary time period approximately 2.5 million years(Before present), Sweden's climate has alternated between glacial periods and interglacial periods. The glacial periods lasted for up to 100,000 years with temperatures possibly 20 °C lower than today's. Colder temperatures resulted in ice sheets covering most or all of Sweden. The interglacial periods were shorter, lasting 10,000–15,000 years. During these periods the climate was similar to today's with extensive forests and ice-free summers. The latest of these glacial periods was the Weichselian glaciation, lasting from about 115,000 years BP until about 11,500 years BP. At its peak 20,000–17,000 years BP, it extended into the northern parts of Germany and Poland. The transition to the current interglacial period was marked by a retreat of the Ice sheets and gradually warmer temperatures. By 6,000–7,000 years BP, the temperature was slightly warmer than today and most of the southern half of the country was covered in deciduous forests. The temperature has fluctuated since then with a weak cooling trend, leading to a relative increase in coniferous tree-cover.

== Impacts on people ==
=== Economic impacts ===
Winter storms Gudrun in 2005 and Per in 2007 in southern Sweden overthrew huge volumes of forest and caused power cuts. Storm Per on 14 January 2007 affected 440,000 electricity users and Gudrun 620,000 customers. The reallocation of capital due to power disruptions during and after storm Per was estimated to be between SEK 1 800 and 3 400 million. The network operators cost was ca SEK 1 400 million, of which SEK 750 million compensation for affected customers. The costs for electricity consumers was estimated to SEK 180–1 800 million.

=== Health impacts ===
Climate change may affect the health status of the population in several ways.

- Warmer weather conditions can affect the elderly and vulnerable people in periods of extremely warm weather.
- Spread of vector-borne diseases, in particular, tick-borne infections like Lyme disease (borreliosis) and tick-borne encephalitis. Ticks have spread northwards and can now even be found in the regions of Norrland. Also, there are still five species of mosquitoes in Sweden that may spread the malaria parasite. With the last indigenous case reported in the 1930s, a few new cases of malaria may appear with increasing temperature. The anopheles species of mosquitoes that spread the malaria parasite are sensitive to weather conditions that can be affected by climate change. Increased precipitation affects the number of hatching places of the mosquitoes, while an increase in humidity and temperature increases the life span of the mosquitoes and the development of the malaria parasite inside the mosquito.
- Quality of water and food can be affected by higher temperatures in the summer and by changes in the water cycle. For example, there are concerns that increased groundwater level fluctuations can mobilize soil contaminants such as heavy metals and that these will spread to the groundwater. Droughts can affect water availability for irrigation and impact crop yields.
- Air quality may be changed with a different composition of dust and pollen grains. Studies of future scenarios project that the spreading of ragweed northwards may cause new cases of allergy and asthma.

==== Cyclone Gudrun in 2005 ====
Estimates of about 730,000 users were without electricity the night of 8 January. The storm also damaged distribution networks of Vattenfall, Kreab Öst and other smaller companies. All the electricity damage also affected telephone and computer networks.

Cyclone Gudrun hit Sweden on 8 January 2005. Before the wind speeds stopped, they had reached a maximum of 43 m/s. Wind speeds were at their strongest in the Bay of Hanö where they reached hurricane level of 33 m/s with gusts of 42 m/s. Areas like Skåne, Blekinge, Halland, Kronoberg, Gotland, and parts of Jönköping, Kalmar, and Västra Götaland counties were hit with winds reaching 30 m/s or more. Additionally, gusts of winds hit Södermanland coast, Lake Mälaren, Lake Hjälmaren and southern parts of Stockholm County. A total of eleven counties were strongly affected by the storm.

Despite the storm occurring in January, the weather at the time was mild which made the need for heat less than usual. District heating systems in urban areas did not suffer from long power cuts to cause problems. However, smaller areas did suffer from heating systems failures. Millions of trees were torn by the roots and others were cut at the trunk. Trees blocked roads and seized traffic. The lack of frost in the ground caused spruce trees to be vulnerable to the high winds. 75 million cubic meters of forest was felled which is equal to several years of normal felling in the affected areas. A major problem was telephone systems failure which delayed the clearing of roads and repair of overhead lines.

Nursing homes and elderly care services were also affected as individual safety alarms did not work. People were stranded in their cars on blocked roads. Seven people were killed in accidents and others were injured on the night of January 8. Other deaths occurred after the storm, for example, one man was killed while attempting to fix his roof. In addition, people suffered from PTSDs.

== Adaptation ==
Sweden has socioeconomical advantages that help heighten the safety awareness to prevent natural disasters. The Swedish Civil Contingencies Agency (MSB) creates guidelines and strategies to help the society adapt to climate change.

=== Floods ===
As Sweden is affected every year by damaging floods, the MSB maintains and compiles general flood inundation maps, which are used for risk vulnerability analysis, emergency preparedness and in land use planning by municipalities. Flood prevention can include pumping equipment, embankments and dykes, or devices to shut down water supply and sewage systems.

=== Forest fires ===
The MSB has created a national information system for fire brigades. The system is found on the Internet and it provides information about how the climate can affect vegetation fire risks. It provides data that helps with prevention and can assist in decision-making.

=== Storms ===
The MSB provides generators that can be borrowed by areas that are hit by a storm and have lost power.

=== Landslides ===
Because of Sweden's location and the nature of the ground, landslides can affect some areas. The MSB provides general stability mapping for areas susceptible to landslides. The maps show which areas can be affected and which areas are in need of detailed geotechnical surveys.

Areas where consequences of a storm can be serious, the government granted 40 million Swedish kronor per year for preventions over the period 2007–2009. Municipalities that have preventive measures can apply for subsidy from these allocated funds. A municipality that has been affected by a natural emergency has the right to ask the state for compensation to cover the exceeding costs.

== Mitigation ==
=== EU Renewable Targets ===
Sweden met its EU member-agreed binding renewable 2020 target in 2012.

=== 2014 United Nations Climate Change Conference ===
At the 2014 United Nations Climate Change Conference the Swedish Society for Nature Conservation (SSNC) demanded:

1. Swedish government should confirm the given election promises of 40% emission decline by 2020
2. International 5-years goals
3. Binding for every country
4. SEK4 billion Kr Swedish green fund for 2015–2018
5. Actively aim concrete agreement text already in Lima 2014

181 students took initiative to work in 2015 for two weeks to improve Swedish climate change carbon footprint in relation to green food, solar energy, bicycles, customs, consumption and wastes.

=== Policy instruments ===
Sweden has applied policy instruments and measures for climate change mitigation since the 1980s. The instruments used include economic instruments (such as CO_{2} tax, subsidies, penalties), legislation, voluntary agreements, and a dialogue between the state and business enterprise. The main instruments are described below:

==== Carbon dioxide tax instrument ====
In Sweden, there are so far three different taxes levied on energy products (mainly fossil fuels), namely energy tax, sulphur tax and CO_{2} tax. Energy taxation has been used as a policy instrument ever since the oil crisis of the 1970s to support renewable energy and nuclear power. Energy tax was reduced by half in 1991 during the tax reform, simultaneously with the introduction of a CO_{2} tax on fossil fuels, with exceptions on ethanol, methanol, other biofuels, peat and wastes.

==== Renewable energy certificate system ====
As one part of the Government's long-term energy policy to reduce GHG emissions, the Swedish government introduced a voluntary international system for trading "green certificates", i.e. the renewable energy certificate system (RECS). With effect from 1 May 2003, RECS intends to encourage and increase the proportion of electricity produced from renewable energy sources. This will be done by payment of a levy in proportion to certain fraction of their electricity during the year. For example, during the first year (2003), users will be required to buy 7.4 per cent of the electricity generated from renewable sources.

==== Renewable energy subsidies and continuous investment on R&D ====
Since 1991, Sweden started many programs to encourage the use of renewable energy and new technology development, e.g. Energy Policy program (Long and short-term programs that focus on ways to increase the supply of renewable electricity, to reduce electricity consumption, and to promote energy efficiency), Green Certificate Scheme (Generators using solar, wind, biomass, geothermal, wave or small hydro are awarded one certificate for each MWh produced, and all consumers are obliged to buy enough certificates to cover a set proportion of their use).

==== International collaboration and carbon trading systems ====
Sweden also shows its leadership in international cooperation and competence on the climate change issues. Sweden actively took part in some international climate policy programs, such as Prototype Carbon Funds (PCF) and Activities Implemented Jointly (AIJ)

==== Oil independence and phase-out targets ====
The government created a Commission on Oil Independence (Kommissionen för att bryta oljeberoendet i Sverige till år 2020) and in 2006 it proposed the following targets for 2020:

- Consumption of oil in road transport to be reduced by 40–50%
- Consumption of oil in industry to be cut by 25–40%
- Heating buildings with oil, a practice already cut by 70% since the 1973 oil crisis, should be phased out
- Overall, energy should be used 20% more efficiently

=== Legislation ===
Sweden's Climate Act, which aims for zero net greenhouse gas emissions by 2045, was agreed upon by the Swedish parliament in June 2017, making Sweden the first country with a legally binding carbon neutrality target. The legislation has been in force since January 1, 2018. After 2045 negative net emissions are targeted. The scope includes compensation projects abroad and emissions trading, but excludes aviation emissions.

The Swedish government published a new plan on 17 December 2019 with 132 actions. Climate law has been in place since 2017. Sweden's goal is to reduce greenhouse gases 85% from the 1990 level by 2045. The 2019 plan outlines specific targeted reductions for aviation and sea travel. The plan includes a carbon tax, tax reform that supports climate and environment goals, a green tax, a climate LCA for buildings in 2022, the requirement that all electricity, heating and transport must be carbon zero in 2045, and promotes private renewable energy projects to make them easier and cheaper. The short-term goal is to reduce emissions from transport sector including aviation within Sweden at least 70% by 2030. Alternatives to private cars in cities are considered. A new price system for collective traffic will be introduced latest in 2022.

==== Paris Agreement ====
The Paris Agreement is a legally international agreement adopted at the COP 21, its main goal is to limit global warming to below 1.5 degrees Celsius, compared to pre-industrial levels. It was ratified by the Swedish parliament on October 16, 2016. The Nationally Determined Contributions (NDC's) are the plans to fight climate change adapted for each country. Every party in the agreement has different goals based on its own historical climate records and the country's circumstances.

In the case for member countries of the European Union the goals are very similar and the European Union work with a common strategy within the Paris Agreement.

== Society and culture ==
=== Public participation ===
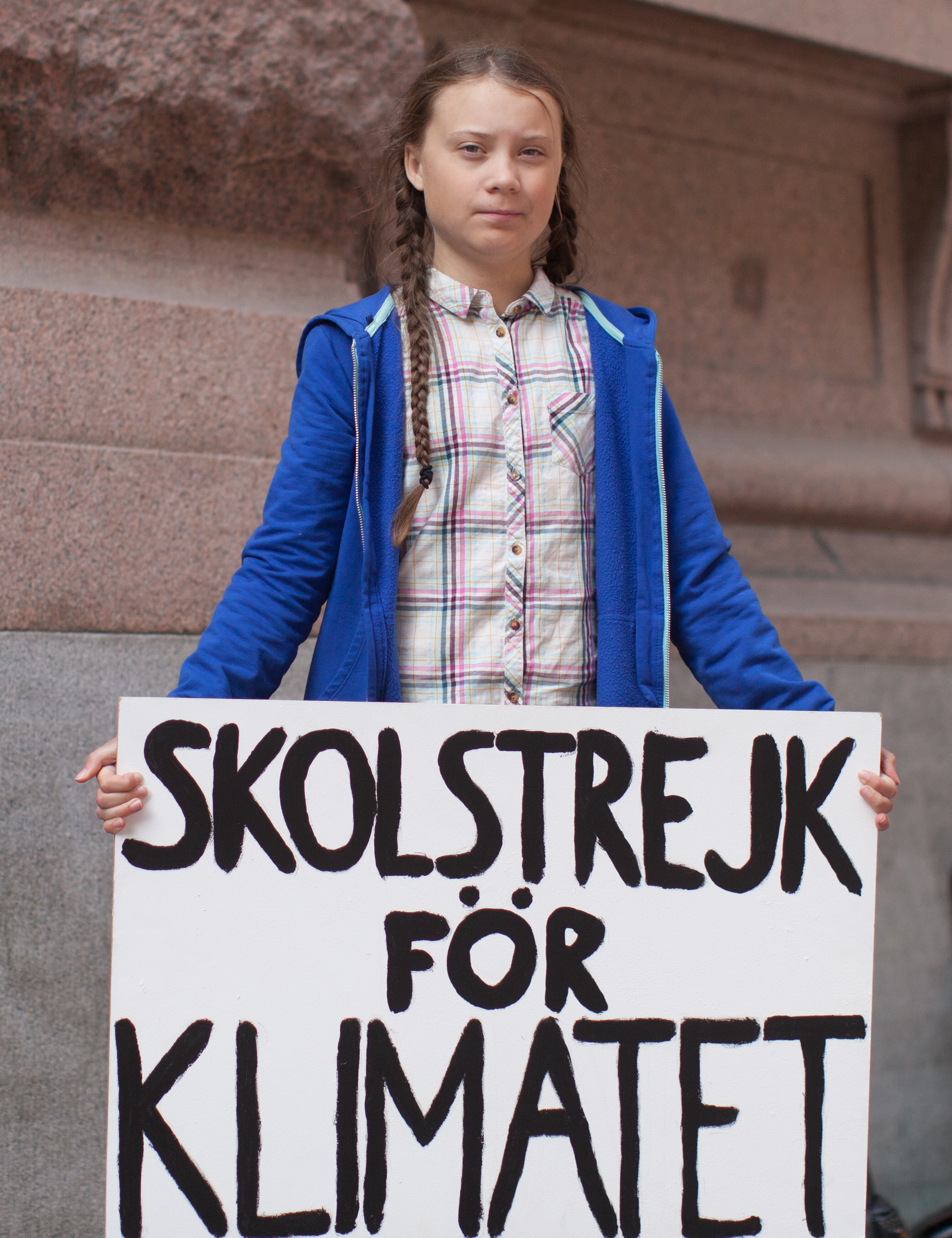
Swedish climate activist Greta Thunberg, who inspired the global School Strike for Climate.

Public participation is quite important in addressing climate change and its effects and developing adequate responses. Without the support of the public, it is impossible to implement a new policy instrument successfully. For example, one cannot anticipate that bio ethanol and bio diesel could be widely consumed without support and understanding from the general population. Therefore, information to raise the public's level of knowledge concerning the climate issue is necessary.

One public initiative, hosted by the KTH Royal Institute of Technology, is the Viable Cities program, which works with nine Swedish cities, including Stockholm, Gothenburg, and Malmö, to support becoming carbon neutral and sustainable by 2030. The initiative, called Climate Neutral Cities 2030, will include 20 Swedish cities by the end of 2021. A new instrument in Viable Cities work is Climate City Contract 2030. It was signed by the top political leadership of the nine municipalities, by the Directors-General of the government agencies Vinnova, the Swedish Energy Agency, Formas and the Swedish Agency for Growth and by Viable Cities in December 2020. Viable Cities' Chief Storyteller is tasked with increasing public participation by developing effective forms of climate communication that promote public engagement.

=== Public perception of climate change ===
A 2002 survey showed that over 95% of respondents said that the use of tax money for addressing climate change was either "Very important" or "Fairly important". A little over half of the respondents were willing to change the use of hot water, electricity consumption and travel arrangement in order to reduce the impact of climate change. A little under half did not want to decrease internal building temperatures as a means of reducing climate change impact. A201

=== Forest owners ===
Forest owners and forestry professionals don't seem to be worried about climate change affecting forests in Sweden. For example, Forest owners in Kronoberg believe that climate change effects are distant and long-term. Stakeholders focus more on personal experience rather than results of how climate change will affect forests in the future. Another forest professional says that nothing they can do today can affect the changes that will happen in the future.

== See also ==
- Biofuel in Sweden
- Climate change in Norway
- Regional effects of global warming
- Arctic Climate Impact Assessment
- List of countries by greenhouse gas emissions per capita
- Plug-in electric vehicles in Sweden
