= Energy in Norway =

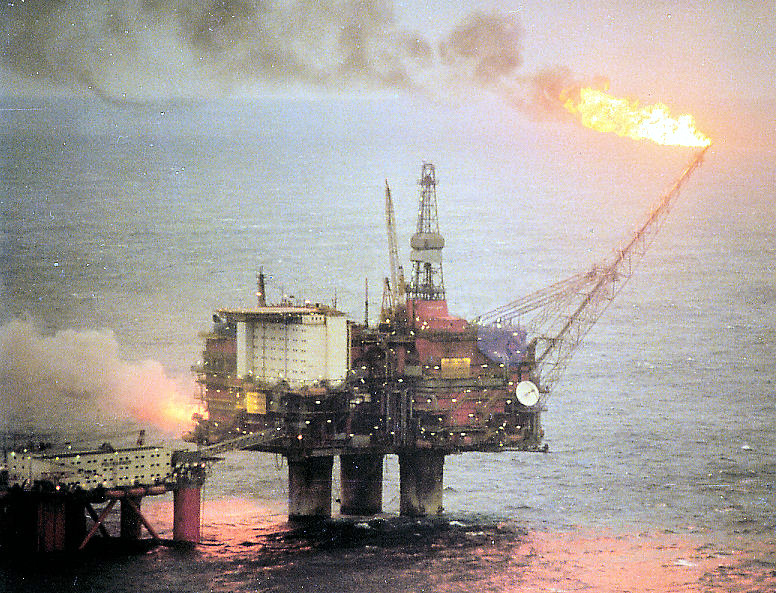
An Equinor oil platform in the North Sea

Development of carbon dioxide emissions

Norway is a large energy producer, and one of the world's largest exporters of oil. Most of the electricity in the country is produced by hydroelectricity. Norway is one of the leading countries in the electrification of its transport sector, with the largest fleet of electric vehicles per capita in the world (see plug-in electric vehicles in Norway and electric car use by country).

Since the discovery of North Sea oil in Norwegian waters during the late 1960s, exports of oil and gas have become very important elements of the economy of Norway. With North Sea oil production having peaked, disagreements over exploration for oil in the Barents Sea, the prospect of exploration in the Arctic, as well as growing international concern over global warming, energy in Norway is currently receiving close attention.

== Statistics ==
2020 energy statistics

Production capacities for electricity (billion kWh)
| Type | Amount |
|---|---|
| Hydro | 309.49 |
| Wind power | 21.51 |
| Fossil fuel | 4.03 |
| Biomass | 1.01 |
| Total | 336.04 |

Electricity (billion kWh)
| Category | Amount |
|---|---|
| Consumption | 124.29 |
| Production | 153.67 |
| Import | 4.50 |
| Export | 24.97 |

Natural Gas (billion m^{3})
| Consumption | 3.98 |
| Production | 112.05 |
| Export | 107.34 |

Crude Oil (barrels per year)
| Consumption | 78,800,000 |
| Production | 739,490,000 |
| Import | 24,200,000 |
| Export | 453,510,000 |

CO_{2} emissions:
36.18million tons

== Energy plan ==
In January 2008, the Norwegian government declared a goal of being carbon neutral by 2030, through the purchase of carbon offsets from other countries.

== Fuel types ==
=== Fossil fuels ===
Countries by natural gas proven reserves, 2014

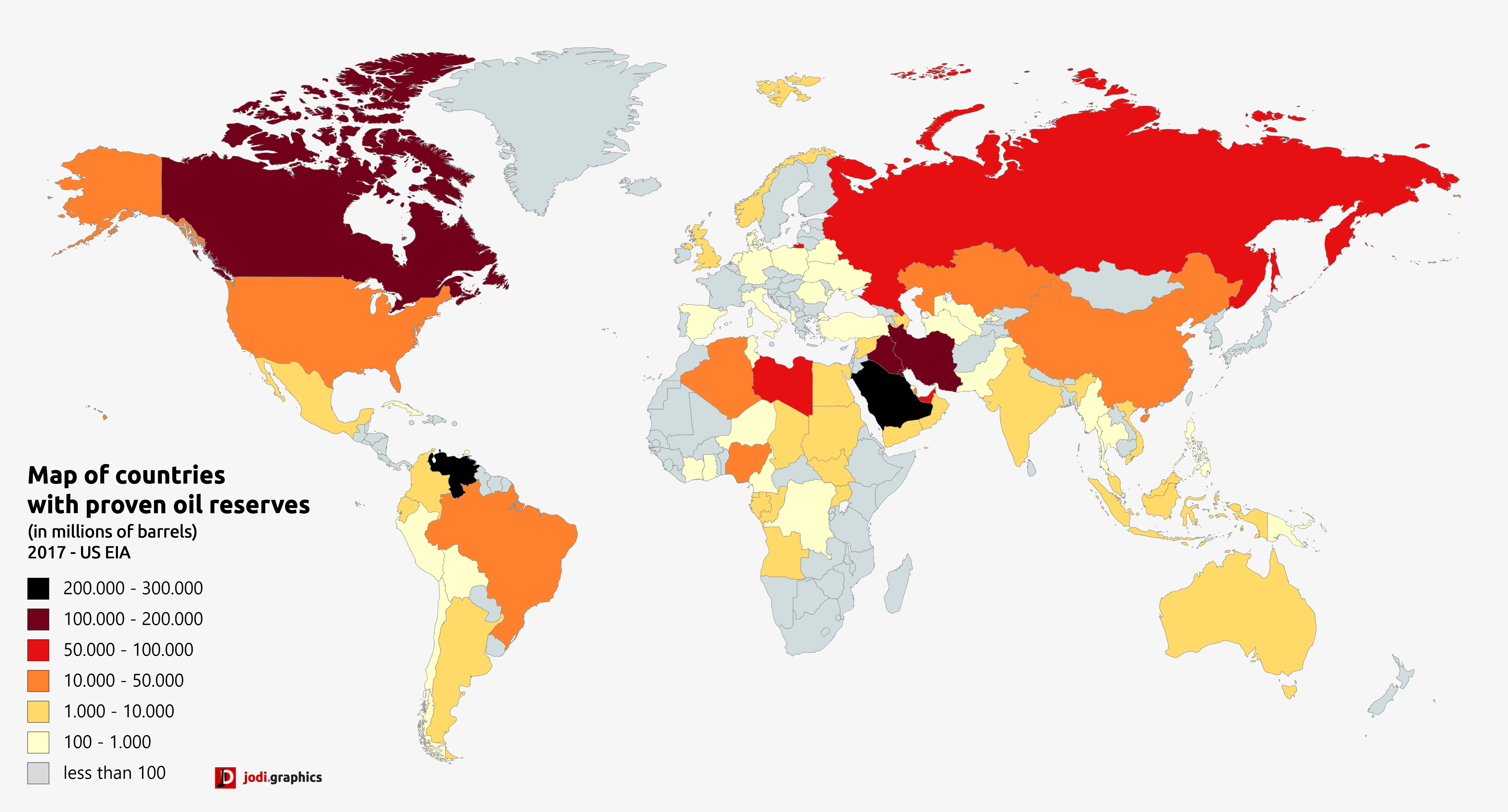
A map of world oil reserves according to U.S. EIA, 2017

In 2011, Norway was the eighth largest crude oil exporter in the world (at 78 Mt), and the 9th largest exporter of refined oil (at 86 Mt). It was also the world's third largest natural gas exporter (at 99 bcm), having significant gas reserves in the North Sea. Norway also possesses some of the world's largest potentially exploitable coal reserves (located under the Norwegian continental shelf) on earth. More recently (2017), the Norwegian government has ranked 3rd worldwide as the largest exporter of natural gas, just behind Russia and Qatar.

Norway's abundant energy resources represent a significant source of national revenue. In 2024, the petroleum sector accounted for about 60% of the country's export revenue. The sector also represented about 17% of GDP. As a means to ensure security and mitigate against the "Dutch disease" characterized by fluctuations in the price of oil, the Norwegian government funnels a portion of this export revenue into a pension fund, the Government Pension Fund Global (GPFG). The Norwegian government receives these funds from their market shares within oil industries, such as their two-thirds share of Equinor, and allocates it through their government-controlled domestic economy. This combination allows the government to distribute the natural resource wealth into welfare investments for the mainland. Tying this fiscal policy to the oil market for equity concerns creates a cost-benefit economic solution towards a public access good problem in which a select few are able to reap the direct benefits of a public good. Domestically, Norway has addressed the complications that occur with oil industry markets in protecting the mainland economy and government intervention in distributing its revenue to combat balance-of-payment shocks and to address energy security.

The externalities engendered from Norway's activities on the environment, pose another concern apart from its domestic economic implications. Most of Norwegian gas is exported to European countries. As of 2020, about 20% of natural gas consumed in Europe comes from Norway, and Norwegian oil supplies 2% of the global consumption of oil. Considering that three million barrels of oil adds 1.3 Mt of CO_{2} per day to the atmosphere as it is consumed, 474 Mt/year, the global CO_{2} impact of Norway's natural resource supply is significant. Despite that, Norway exports eight times the amount of energy consumed domestically, most of Norway's carbon emissions are from its oil and gas industry (30%) and road traffic (23%). To address the problem of CO_{2} emissions, the Norwegian government has adopted different measures, including signing multilateral and bilateral treaties to cut its emissions in lieu of rising global environmental concerns.

According to a report from Norsk Petroleum, oil and petroleum is Norway's most crucial commodity export. In 2020, 40% of Norway's exports stemmed from the petroleum sector. This had an export value of 333 billion NOK. 2% of the world's oil consumption is produced by Norway making it the 15th largest oil producer in the world in 2019. Fossil fuels act as a major economic boost in Norway, meanwhile driving down the domestic energy costs. Fossil fuels operations in Norway is also a large source of Norwegian's employment.

It has been argued that Norway can serve as a role model for many countries in terms of petroleum resource management. In Norway, good institutions and open and dynamic public debate involving a whole variety of civil society actors are key factors for successful petroleum governance.

The International Energy Agency notes in a 2018 report that the fossil fuel industry in Norway may face various challenges in the future. New sources of energy and methods of production like shale and hydraulic fracturing (commonly known as fracking) may substitute oil and gas. Renewable energy also poses a large risk to reducing fossil fuel production and deployment of new technologies. A new generation of people in the workforce may also lead oil producers to face backlash. Oil is facing a decline in price on the global market which plays a large role in global and European decarbonisation The diminishing consumption of oil is impending, but the speed and scale of the transition to renewable energy sources is debated. In this regard, peak demand of oil is a large topic of discussion for oil producers. Current and future prices of oil has a much larger effect on peak demand for oil producers than solely relying on sales volumes' immediate effect. Scholars also question when oil and gas will reach its peak demand, but an increasing amount of scholars are more concerned with what happens after the peak - whether there will be a plateau, gentle decline, or sudden collapse

Increasing competition among oil suppliers also poses as a challenge within the fossil fuel debate. The evident transition to renewable energy may cause suppliers to quickly secure the remaining supply of oil so their fossil fuel assets do not go unprofitable and undeveloped. The European Union's history of taxing oil products and carbon-intensive also supports the transition away from fossil fuels.

==== Natural gas ====
In the aftermath of the Nord Stream pipelines sabotage in 2022, Norway became the leading natural gas supplier to the European Union (EU). According to Lukas Trakimavičius, an energy security expert from the Center for European Policy Analysis (CEPA), there is a risk that hostile actors could try to negatively affect the European Union's natural gas security by targeting Norway's offshore gas infrastructure. Considering the size and remoteness of Norway's subsea pipelines, attribution of such an attack could be very difficult. Data released in September 2022 based on August figures, revealed Norway had hit a record trade surplus due to the jump in gas prices and being the EU's biggest supplier. By 2024 data, Norway remained the top supplier of gas to the EU, increasing 2.9% from 2023 to 2024. In December 2025, the EU agreed to a full ban on Russian gas imports by 2027, whom still made up almost 20% of the gas market in the EU.

==== North Sea oil ====
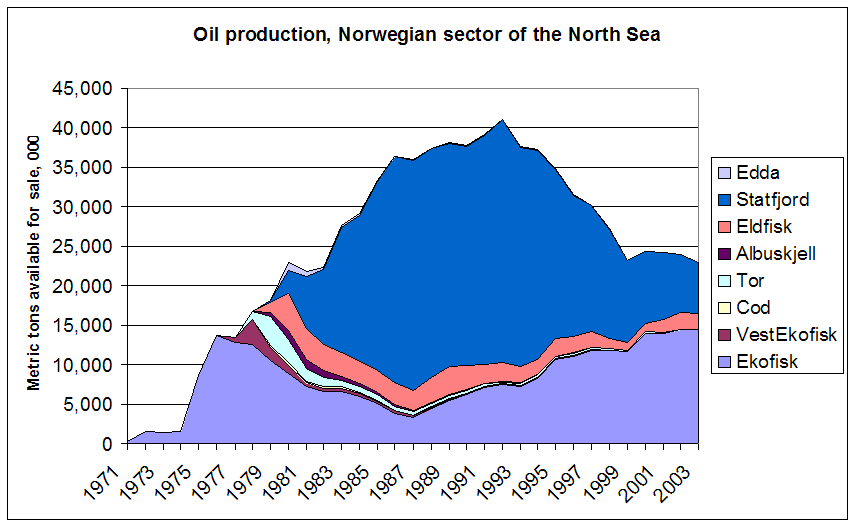
Source: Norwegian Central Bureau of Statistics

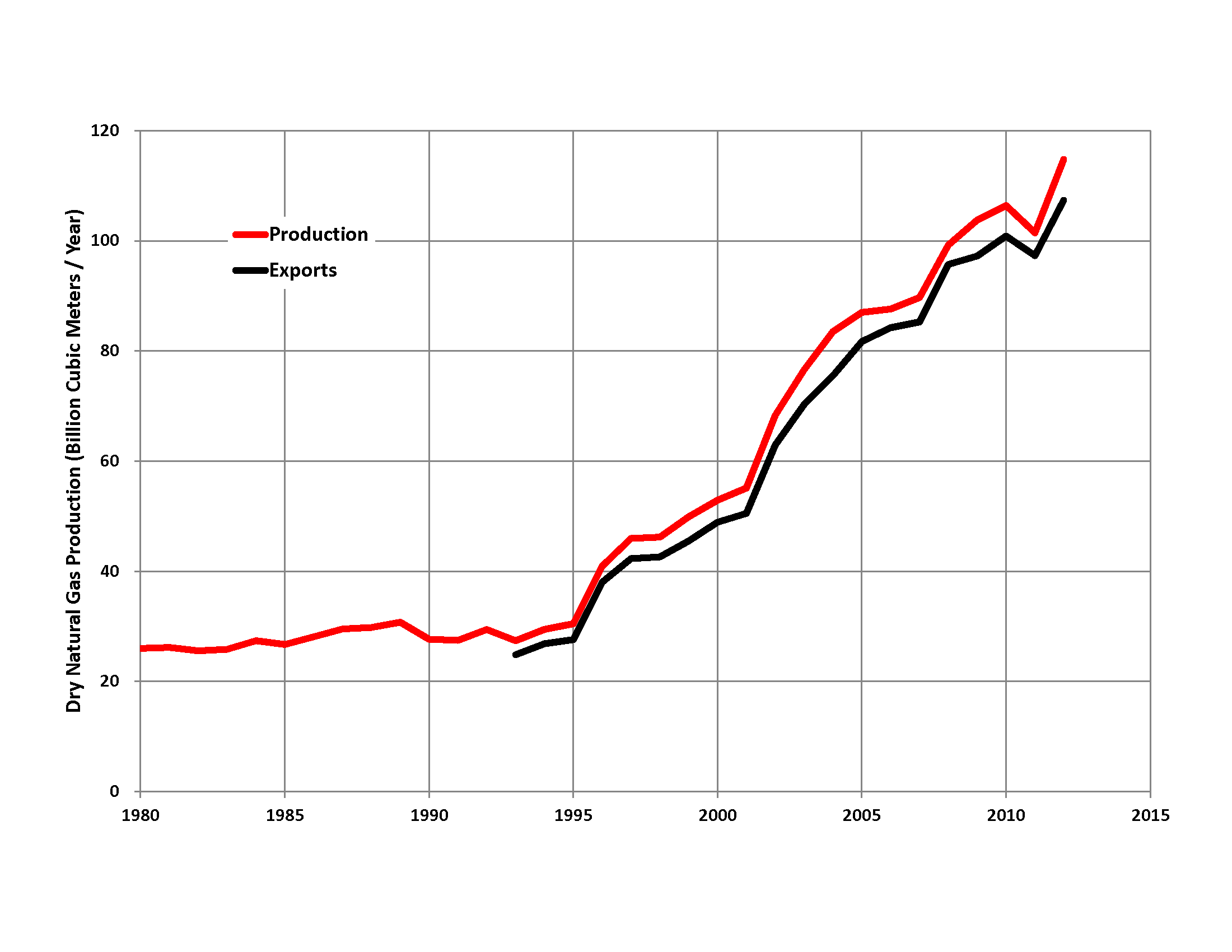
Natural gas production in Norway (red) and natural gas exports (black)

In May 1963, Norway asserted sovereign rights over natural resources in its sector of the North Sea. Exploration started on 19 July 1966, when Ocean Traveller drilled its first hole. Initial exploration was fruitless, until Ocean Viking found oil on 21 August 1969. By the end of 1969, it was clear that there were large oil and gas reserves in the North Sea. The first oil field was Ekofisk, which produced 427,442 barrels of crude in 1980. Subsequently, large natural gas reserves have also been discovered and it was specifically this huge amount of oil found in the North Sea that made Norway's separate path outside the EU facile.

Against the backdrop of the 1972 Norwegian referendum to not join the European Union, the Norwegian Ministry of Industry, headed by Ola Skjåk Bræk moved quickly to establish a national energy policy. Norway decided to stay out of OPEC, keep its own energy prices in line with world markets, and spend the revenue—known as the "currency gift"—in the Petroleum Fund of Norway. The Norwegian government established its own oil company, Statoil (since renamed Equinor), which was raised that year, and awarded drilling and production rights to Norsk Hydro and the Saga Petroleum.

The North Sea turned out to present many technical challenges for production and exploration, and Norwegian companies invested in building capabilities to meet these challenges. A number of engineering and construction companies emerged from the remnants of the largely lost shipbuilding industry, creating centers of competence in Stavanger and the western suburbs of Oslo. Stavanger also became the land-based staging area for the offshore drilling industry. Due to refinery needs when making special qualities of commercial oils, Norway imported NOK 3.5 billion of foreign oil in 2015.

==== Barents Sea oil ====
In March 2005, Minister of Foreign Affairs Jan Petersen stated that the Barents Sea, off the coast of Norway and Russia, may hold one third of the world's remaining undiscovered oil and gas. Also in 2005, the moratorium on exploration in the Norwegian sector, imposed in 2001 due to environmental concerns, was lifted following a change in government. A terminal and liquefied natural gas plant is now being constructed at Snøhvit, it is thought that Snøhvit may also act as a future staging post for oil exploration in the Arctic Ocean.

=== Renewable energy ===
==== Wind power ====
In 2021, 64 wind farms had total installed wind power capacity of 4,649 MW with 706 MW of onshore power being added in 2021. Electricity produced in 2021 being 11.8 TWh or 8.5% of Norway's needs.

==== Solar power ====
In 2022 solar power had a capacity of 321 MW and produced around 0.3 TWh of electricity per annum.

=== Hydroelectric power ===
Norway is Europe's largest producer of hydropower.

=== Tidal power ===
Norway was the first country to generate electricity commercially using sea-bed tidal power. A 300-kilowatt prototype underwater turbine started generation in Kvalsund Municipality, south of Hammerfest, on 13 November 2003.

== Electricity generation ==
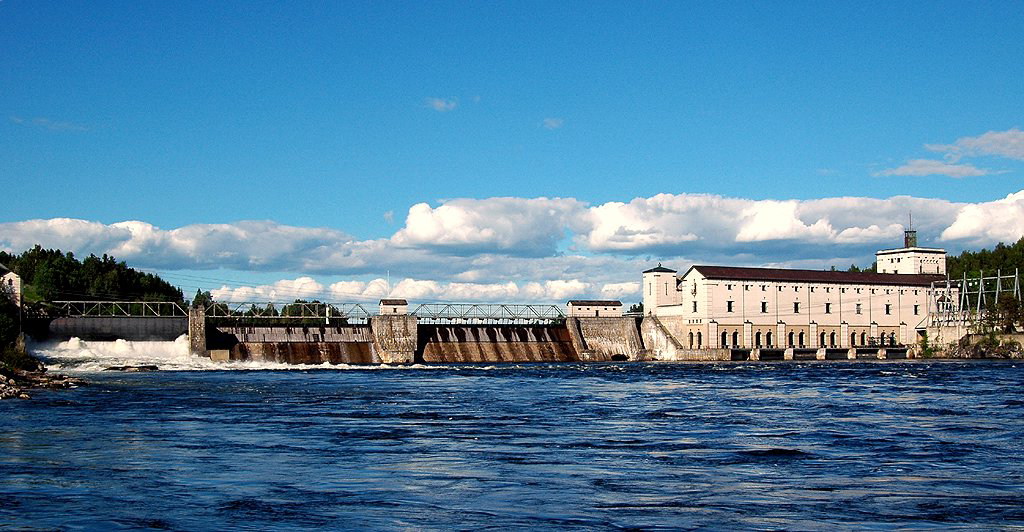
The Rånåsfoss power station (98MW) on the Glomma River. Norway's 1,166 hydroelectric generating stations provide between 98% and 99% of the country's power supply.

Electricity generation in Norway is almost entirely from hydroelectric power plants. Of the total production in 2005 of 137.8 TWh, 136 TWh was from hydroelectric plants, 0.86 TWh was from thermal power, and 0.5 TWh was wind generated. In 2005 the total consumption was 125.8 TWh.

Norway and Sweden's grids have long been connected. Beginning in 1977 the Norwegian and Danish grids were connected with the Skagerrak power transmission system with a transmission capacity of 500 MW, growing to 1,700 MW in 2015. Since 6 May 2008, the Norwegian and Dutch electricity grids have been interconnected by the NorNed submarine HVDC (450 kilovolts) cable with a capacity of 700 megawatts.

== Policies to curb carbon emissions ==
Despite producing the majority of its electricity from hydroelectric plants, Norway is ranked 30th in the 2008 list of countries by carbon dioxide emissions per capita and 37th in the 2004 list of countries by ratio of GDP to carbon dioxide emissions. Norway is a signatory to the Kyoto Protocol, under which it agreed to reduce its carbon emissions to no more than 1% above 1990 levels by 2012.

On 19 April 2007 Prime Minister Jens Stoltenberg announced to the Labour Party annual congress that Norway's greenhouse gas emissions would be cut by 10 percent more than its Kyoto commitment by 2012, and that the government had agreed to achieve emission cuts of 30% by 2020. He also proposed that Norway should become carbon neutral by 2050, and called upon other rich countries to do likewise. This carbon neutrality would be achieved partly by carbon offsetting, a proposal criticised by Greenpeace, who also called on Norway to take responsibility for the 500 m tonnes of emissions caused by its exports of oil and gas. World Wildlife Fund Norway also believes that the purchase of carbon offsets is unacceptable, saying "it is a political stillbirth to believe that China will quietly accept that Norway will buy climate quotas abroad". The Norwegian environmental activist Bellona Foundation believes that the prime minister was forced to act due to pressure from anti-European Union members of the coalition government, and called the announcement "visions without content".

Globally, Norway set a clear agenda in terms of climate leadership and mitigating negative consequences stemming from climate change. In terms of climate goals, Norway, along with The Netherlands, has one of the strictest timelines to eliminate fossil fuels and reduction carbon emissions. However, The Federation of Norwegian Industries notes in a 2021 report that Norway is far from realising its goals concerning climate action and reducing emissions from carbon for both 2030 and 2050

=== Carbon capture and storage ===
Norway was the first country to operate an industrial-scale carbon capture and storage project at the Sleipner oilfield, dating from 1996 and operated by Equinor. Carbon dioxide is stripped from natural gas with amine solvents and is deposited in a saline formation. The carbon dioxide is a waste product of the field's natural gas production; the gas contains 9% CO_{2}, more than is allowed in the natural gas distribution network. Storing it underground avoids this problem and saves Equinor hundreds of millions of euros in carbon taxes. Sleipner stores about one million tonnes of CO_{2} a year.

Large oil companies have invested in carbon capture and storage technology in Norway. The Northern Lights Project is the world's first network project within carbon capture and storage signed by Equinox, Shell, and Total totalling US$675 million.

=== Carbon tax ===
Norway introduced a carbon tax on fuels in 1991. The tax started at a rate of US$51 per tonne of CO_{2} on gasoline, with an average tax of US$21 per tonne. The tax applied to diesel, mineral oil, oil and gas used in North Sea extraction activities. The International Energy Agency's (IEA) in 2001 stated that "since 1991 a carbon dioxide tax has applied in addition to excise taxes on fuel." It is among the highest rates in OECD. The applies to offshore oil and gas production. IEA estimates for revenue generated by the tax in 2004 were 7,808 million NOK (about US$1.3 billion in 2010 dollars).

According to IEA's 2005 Review, Norway's CO_{2} tax is its most important climate policy instrument, and covers about 64% of Norwegian CO_{2} emissions and 52% of total greenhouse gas emissions. Some industry sectors were exempted to preserve their competitive position. Various studies in the 1990s, and an economic analysis by Statistics Norway, estimated the effect to be a reduction of 2.5–11% of Norwegian emissions compared to (untaxed) business-as-usual. However, Norway's per capita emissions still rose by 15% as of 2008.

In attempt to reduce CO_{2} emissions by a larger amount, Norway implemented an Emissions Trading Scheme in 2005 and joined the European Union Emissions Trading Scheme (EU ETS) in 2008. As of 2013, roughly 55% of CO_{2} emissions in Norway were taxed and exempt emissions are included in the EU ETS. Certain CO_{2} taxes are applied to emissions that result from petroleum activities on the continental shelf. This tax is charged per liter of oil and natural gas liquids produced, as well as per standard cubic meter of gas flared or otherwise emitted. However, this carbon tax is a tax deductible operating cost for petroleum production. In 2013, carbon tax rates were doubled to 0.96 NOK per liter/standard cubic meter of mineral oil and natural gas. As of 2016, the rate increased to 1,02 NOK. The Norwegian Ministry of the Environment described CO_{2} taxes as the most important tool for reducing emissions.

== See also ==
- 1990 Norwegian oil workers' strike
- Carbon footprint
- Climate change in Norway
- Energy policy
- European Economic Area
- Future energy development
- Natural resources of the Arctic
- Oil megaprojects (2011)
- Peak oil
- Renewable energy in Norway
