= Plug-in electric vehicles in Sweden =

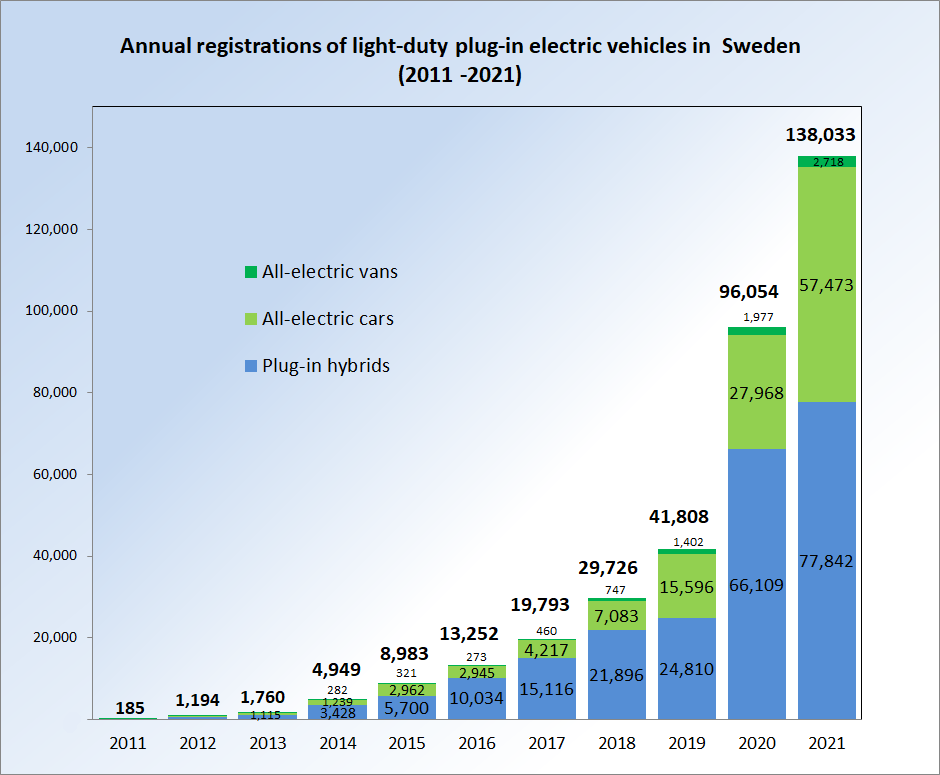
Annual plug-in electric vehicle registrations in Sweden between 2011 and 2021.

The adoption of plug-in electric vehicles in Sweden is actively supported by the Government of the Kingdom of Sweden. As of December 2021, a total of 355,737 light-duty plug-in electric vehicles have been registered since 2011, consisting of 226,731 plug-in hybrids, 120,343 all-electric cars, and 8,663 fully electric commercial vans. The electric vehicles share in Sweden in 2025 amounted to 16% of total vehicle stock. In 2024, the electric vehicles share was 14%.

Sweden has ranked among the world's top ten best-selling plug-in markets since 2015, listed through 2019 as the ninth largest country market. As of December 2019, the Swedish stock of plug-in passenger cars listed as the sixth largest in Europe.

The Swedish plug-in electric market is dominated by plug-in hybrids, representing 75.1% of the Swedish light-duty plug-in electric vehicle registrations through 2018, but began to slightly decline afterwards, reaching 70.3% in 2020, and 57.5 in 2021.

The market share of plug-in electric vehicles climbed from 0.57% in 2013 to 1.53% of new car sales in the country in 2014. The segment market share reached 2.5% in 2015, rose to 5.2% in 2017, 11.3% in 2019, to 32.2% in 2020., 45.0% in 2021, 59,8% in 2023, 58,4% in 2024, 63.2% in 2025. For other segments, in 2021 the share of fully electric light trucks was 7.5% and 24.6% for electric buses.

== Government incentives ==
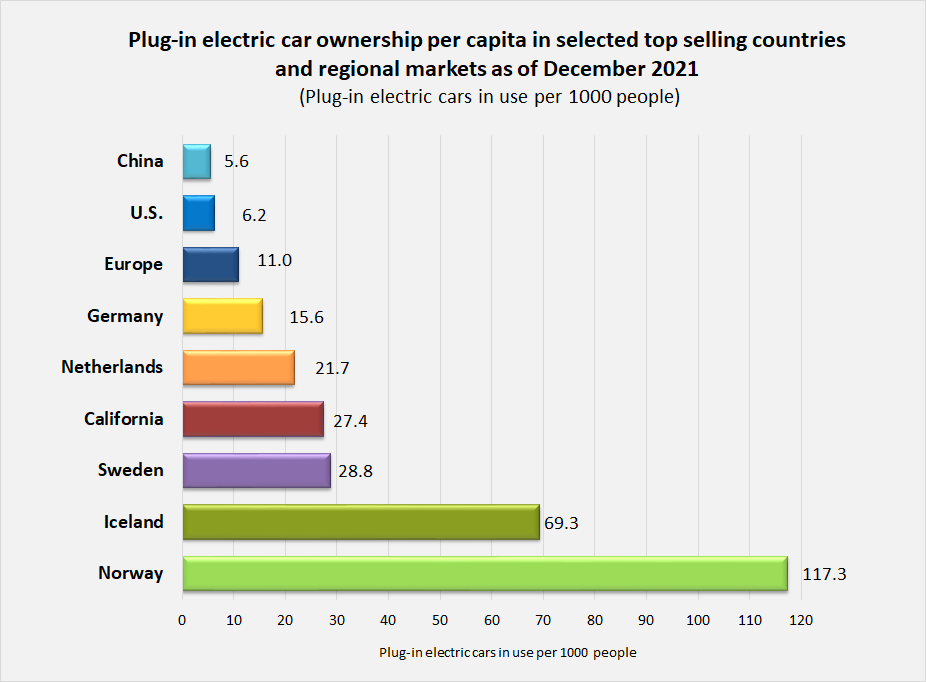
Comparison of Sweden's ownership of plug-in electric cars in use per 1,000 people with other top selling plug-in car countries and regional markets, as of December 2021.

Cumulative sales of light-duty plug-in electric vehicles in Sweden compared to the world's top-selling countries and regional markets as of December 2021.

In September 2011 the Swedish government approved a 200 million kr program, effective starting in January 2012, to provide a subsidy of 40,000 kr per car for the purchase of 5,000 electric cars and other "super green cars" with ultra-low carbon emissions, defined as those with emissions below 50 grams of carbon dioxide (CO_{2}) per km. There is also an exemption from the annual circulation tax for the first five years from the date of their first registration that benefits owners of electric vehicles with an energy consumption of 37 kWh per 100 km or less, and hybrid vehicles with CO_{2} emissions of 120 g/km or less. In addition, for both electric and hybrid vehicles, the taxable value of the car for the purposes of calculating the benefit in kind of a company car under personal income tax is reduced by 40% compared with the corresponding or comparable gasoline or diesel-powered car. The reduction of the taxable value has a cap of 16,000 kr per year.

By July 2014 the program ran out of funds as a total of 5,028 new "super clean cars" had been registered in the country since January 2012. BIL Sweden, the national association for the automobile industry, requested the government an additional 100 million kr to cover the subsidy for another 2,500 registrations of new super clean cars between August and December 2014. In December 2014 the Riksdagen, the Swedish parliament, approved an appropriation of 215 million kr to finance the super clean car subsidies in 2015. The appropriation for 2015, according to the parliamentary decision and subsequent government decision, was to also be used for the retroactive payment of the super green cars registered in 2014 that did not receive the subsidy.

The Government raised the appropriation for the super green car rebate by 132 million kr for 2015 and by 94 million kr for 2016. Beginning in 2016, only zero emissions cars are entitled to receive the full 40,000 kr premium, while other super green cars, plug-in hybrids, receive half premium. The exemption for the first five years of ownership from the annual circulation tax is still in place. In 2016, in order to promote the introduction of electricity-powered buses in the market, the Government planned to allocate 50 million kr for 2016 and 100 million kr per year between 2017 and 2019 to introduce an electric bus premium.

Two alternative proposals are being considered by the Swedish government regarding the introduction of a bonus–malus system. Both proposals entail changes to vehicle and car benefit taxation and the premium system for purchases of new cars. An official inquiry report was due by 29 April 2016. The goal is for the system to enter into force on 1 January 2017.

In November 2022, the bonus part of the bonus-malus system was removed by the newly elected right-wing government with one day notice.

== Registrations ==
As of December 2017, a total of 50,304 light-duty plug-in vehicles have been registered since 2011, consisting of 36,405 plug-in hybrids, 12,223 all-electric cars, and 1,676 all-electric vans. The plug-in segment has been dominated by plug-in hybrids, which represent 74.9% of plug-in car registrations through 2017. The market share of plug-in electric vehicles climbed from 0.57% in 2013 to 1.53% of new car sales in the country in 2014. The segment market share reached 2.5% in 2015, rose to 3.5% in 2016, and achieved a record of 5.2% in 2017.

=== 2011–2014 ===
A total of 178 all-electric cars were registered in Sweden in 2011, and registrations of plug-in electric vehicles climbed to 928 units in 2012, led by the Toyota Prius Plug-in Hybrid with 499 units, followed by the Nissan Leaf with 129 units, and the third place was shared by the Volvo C30 Electric and the Opel Ampera with 88 units each. Electric-drive cars reached a market share of 0.33% in 2012. In addition, 265 Renault Kangoo Z.E. utility vans were sold in 2012. During 2013 a total of 1,545 plug-in electric cars were registered in the country out of 269,363 new passenger cars sold, representing a market share of 0.57%. With 1,113 units registered in 2013, plug-in hybrids represented 72.0% of total plug-in electric car registrations. This number includes 10 BMW i3s sold with the range extender option, which in Sweden are classified as plug-in hybrids. The top selling plug-in cars during 2013 were the Volvo V60 PHEV with 601 units, the Prius PHV with 376 and the Nissan Leaf with 317.

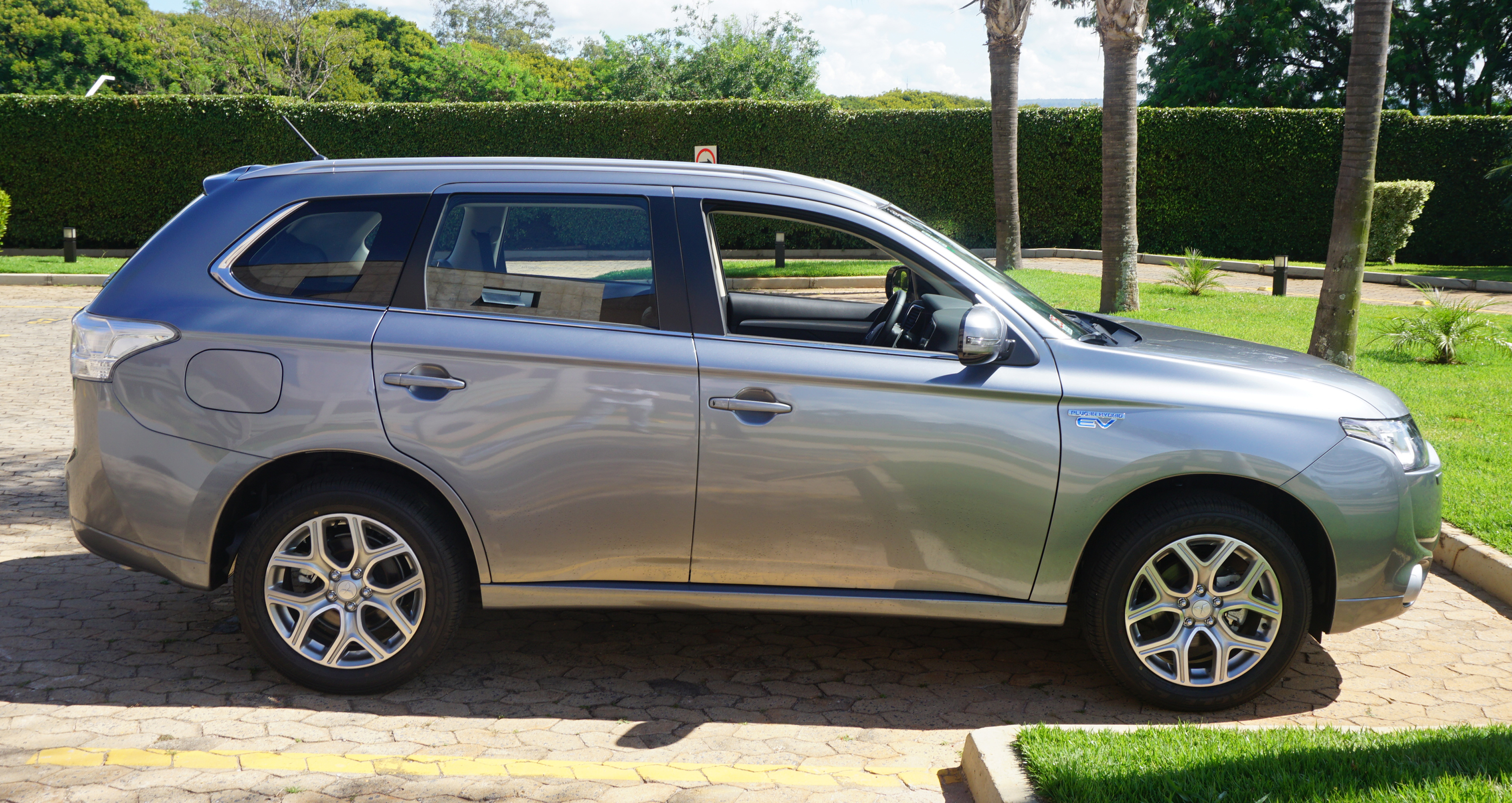
The Mitsubishi Outlander P-HEV was the top selling plug-in electric car in 2014 and 2015, and, as of December 2016, remains as the all-time best-selling plug-in car in Sweden.

Plug-in electric car sales during 2014 grew significantly. Registrations of super clean cars increased five-fold in July 2014 driven by the end of the quota of 5,000 new cars eligible for the super clean car subsidy. A total of 4,656 plug-in super clean passenger cars were registered in 2014, representing a 1.53% market share of new passenger cars registered in the country in 2014. Registrations of super clean cars were up 201% from 2013, while registrations of new passenger cars increased 12.7%. Super clean cars represented 8.8% of alternative fuel cars sold during 2014. The top selling plug-in electric cars in 2014 were the Mitsubishi Outlander P-HEV with 2,289 units, Volvo V60 PHEV with 745, and the Nissan Leaf with 438 units. The top selling all-electric utility van was the Kangoo Z.E. with 242 units out of a total of 282 electric vans registered.

=== 2015–2016 ===
A total of 8,908 light-duty plug-in electric vehicles were registered in 2015, up 80% from 2014. The registered stock consisted of 5,625 plug-in hybrids, 2,962 all-electric cars and 321 all-electric utility vans. The plug-in segment had a market share of 2.49% of new car sales in 2015. The Mitsubishi Outlander P-HEV was the top selling plug-in car for a second year running with 3,302 units registered in 2015, followed by the Tesla Model S with 996 units. The top selling all-electric utility van was the Nissan e-NV200 with 168 units. As of December 2015, a total of 16,996 plug-in electric vehicles had registered in Sweden since 2011, up from 7,342 at the end of 2014 (131.5%).

Registrations totaled 13,454 light-duty plug-in electric vehicles in 2016, consisting 10,257 plug-in hybrids, up 16.7% from 2015, 2,924 all-electric cars, up 4.8% year-on-year, and 273 all-electric vans down 15.9% from 2015. Super clean car registrations totaled 12,995 units, up 51.4% from 2015. The plug-in electric car segment achieved a market share of 3.5% of all new cars registered in 2016, the world's third largest after Norway and the Netherlands. Stockholm county registered the highest proportion of super green car registrations during the first nine months of 2016, with 5.6% of the country's total. The proportion during September 2016 was 8.5%. In 2016 the Volkswagen Passat GTE listed as the top selling plug-in car with 3,804 units, followed by the Outlander P-HEV (1,819), Volvo V60 PHEV (1,239), Volvo XC90 T8 (983), Tesla Model S (838), and Nissan Leaf (836). The top selling all-electric utility van was the Renault Kangoo Z.E. with 171 units registered.

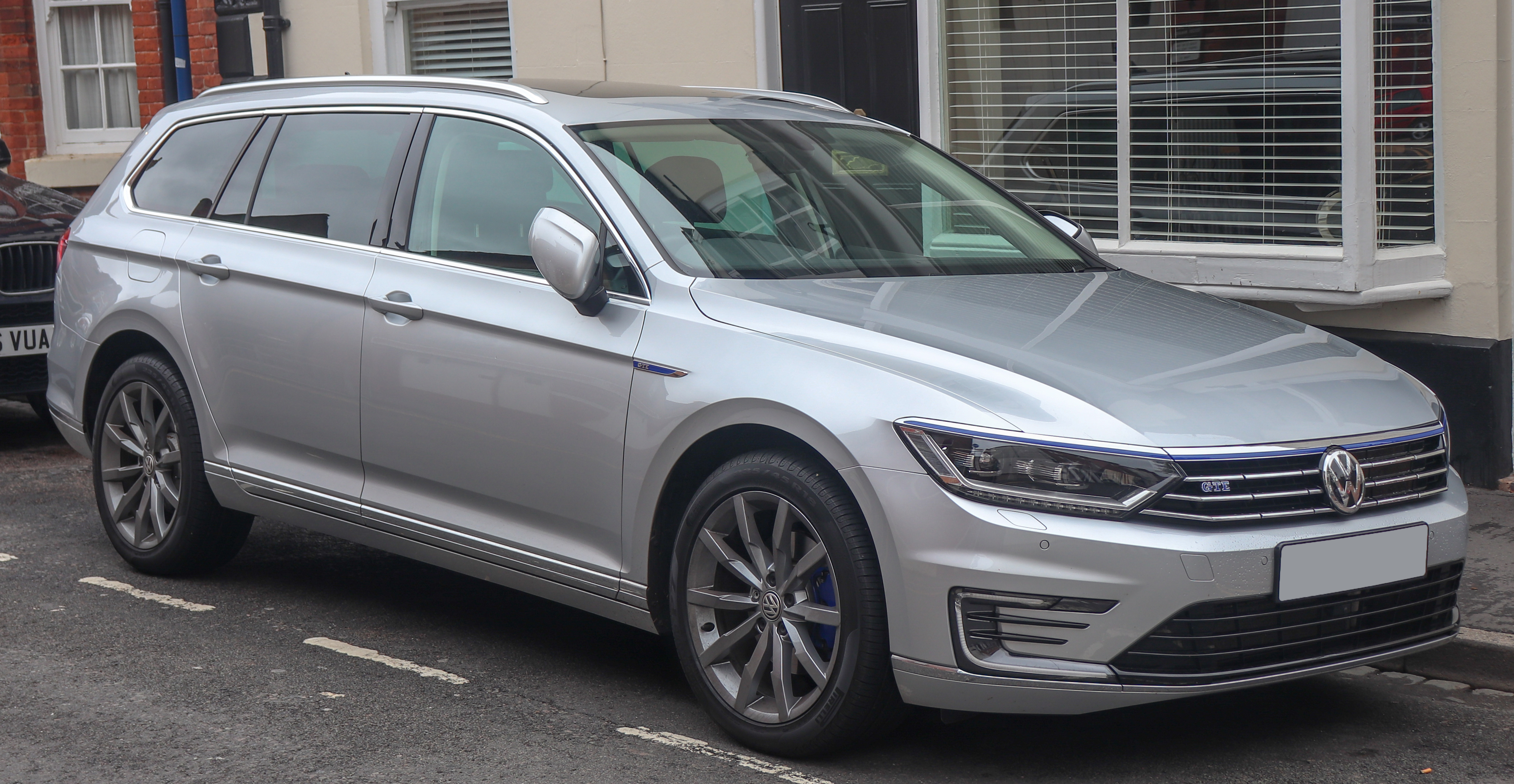
The Volkswagen Passat GTE listed as the top-selling plug-in electric car in Sweden in 2016 and 2017, and ranks as the all-time second best-selling plug-in in the country.

As of December 2016, the all-time top selling plug-in electric cars are the Mitsubishi Outlander P-HEV with 7,506 units registered, followed by the Volkswagen Passat GTE (4,075), Volvo V60 PHEV (3,239), Nissan Leaf (2,561) and Tesla Model S (2,099). The Renault Kangoo Z.E. continued as the all-time the leader in the plug-in commercial utility segment with 1,024 units. The following table presents registrations of highway-capable plug-in electric passenger cars by model between January 2011 and September 2016.

=== 2017 ===
A total of 19,981 light-duty plug-in vehicles were registered in 2017, consisting of 15,447 plug-in hybrids, 4,217 all-electric cars, and 317 all-electric vans. Passenger car registrations totaled 379,393 units in 2017, of which, the plug-in segment captured a market share of 5.2%. Registrations of super green cars totaled 19,211 units, up from 12,995 in 2016. The market continues to be dominated by plug-in hybrids, representing 74.9% of plug-in car registrations between 2011 and 2017.

The top selling model in 2017 was the Volkswagen Passat GTE plug-in hybrid with 4,624 units registered, followed by the Mitsubishi Outlander PHEV with 2,452 units, Kia Optima PHEV with 1,534, the Volvo V60 N PHEV with 1,239, and the Nissan Leaf with 836 units. As of December 2017, the Outlander PHEV continues to rank as the all-time top selling plug-in electric car with 9,957 units registered.

=== Registrations by model ===
Registration of highway-capable plug-in electric passenger cars by model in Sweden between 2011 and September 2016
Model		Total Registered	Market share^{(1)}	CYTD 3Q 2016	2015	2014	2013	2012	2011
Mitsubishi Outlander P-HEV		6,781	26.9%	1,094	3,302	2,289	96		
Volkswagen Passat GTE		3,156	12.5%	2,885	271				
Volvo V60 PHEV		2,907	11.5%	907	612	745	601	42	
Nissan Leaf		2,349	9.3%	624	841	438	317	129	
Tesla Model S		1,882	7.5%	620	996	266			
Toyota Prius PHV		1,262	5.0%	45	132	210	376	499	
BMW i3	Total	951	3.8%	351	379	210	11		
BMW i3	REx	678	2.7%	261	275	132	10		
BMW i3	BEV	273	1.1%	90	104	78	1		
Renault Zoe		874	3.5%	292	378	204			
Volvo XC90 T8		857	3.4%	692	165				
Volkswagen Golf GTE		725	2.9%	324	401				
Volkswagen e-Up!		491	1.9%	95	157	199	40		
Audi A3 e-tron		478	1.9%	115	349	14			
BMW 330e iPerformance		440	1.7%	440					
Volkswagen e-Golf		395	1.6%	100	278	17			
Volvo C30 Electric		198	0.8%	0	0	16	46	88	48
BMW X5 xDrive40e		169	0.7%	169					
Nissan e-NV200 (passenger van)		167	0.7%	36	131				
Mercedes-Benz C 350 e		157	0.6%	86	71				
BMW 225xe Active Tourer		152	0.6%	152					
Tesla Model X		139	0.6%	139					
Opel Ampera		147	0.6%	0	16	22	21	88	
Mitsubishi i MiEV		101	0.4%	3	0	6	12	9	71
Kia Soul EV		78	0.3%	26	50	2			
Citroën C-Zero		71	0.3%	0	0	4	7	29	31
BMW i8		51	0.2%	20	25	6			
Chevrolet Volt		40	0.2%	0	0	0	7	33	
Peugeot iOn		39	0.2%	0	0	2	0	9	28
Mercedes-Benz B-Class Electric Drive		38	0.15%	14	24				
Audi Q7 e-tron		32	0.13%	32					
Porsche Panamera S E-Hybrid		22	0.09%	4	6	10	2		
Fisker Karma		21	0.08%	0	0	0	2	19	
Ford Focus Electric		9	0.04%	0	3	2	4		
Porsche 918 Spyder		6	0.02%	1	1	4			
Saab 9-3 ePower		6	0.02%	2	0	4			
BMW 740e iPerformance		6	0.02%	6					
Volkswagen XL1		2	0.01%	2					
Smart electric drive		2	0.01%	0	0	0	0	2	
Total plug-in passenger car registrations		25,207^{(2)}	100%	9,276^{(2)}	8,588^{(2)}	4,671^{(2)}	1,547^{(2)}	947	178
Notes: (1) Market share as percentage of the 25,207 plug-in electric passenger cars registered in Sweden between 2011 and September 2016. The number of super clean cars during the same period is 24,983 units, excluding fuel cell vehicle registrations. (2) According to the official Swedish definition of super clean cars (CO_{2} emissions of up to 50 g/km), the Fisker Karma, the two Porsche plug-in models, the Panamera S E-Hybrid and the 918 Spyder, and two BMW models, the X5 xDrive40e and 740e iPerformance, are not classified as super clean cars, instead they are accounted for as conventional hybrids.

== See also ==
- Electric car use by country
- Government incentives for plug-in electric vehicles
- List of modern production plug-in electric vehicles
- Swedish Transport Administration electric road program
