= Economy of Sweden =

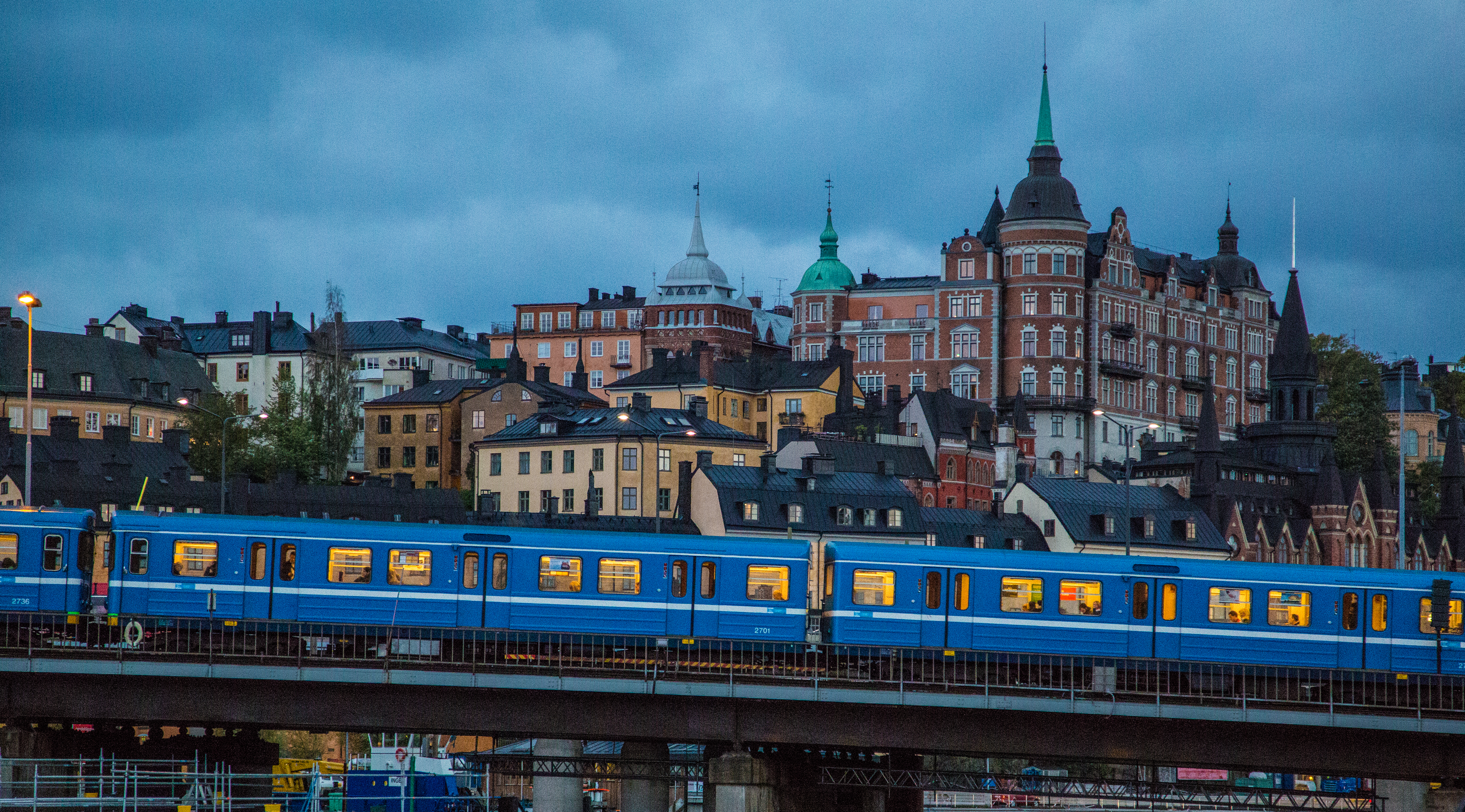
- Currency: Swedish krona (SEK • KR)
- Fiscal year: Calendar year
- Trade organisations: EU, WTO, OECD and others
- Country group: Advanced economy; High-income economy; Largest Nordic economy

Statistics
- Population: ▲10,605,529 (2025)
- GDP: ▲$760.48 billion (nominal; 2026); ▲$829.54 billion (PPP; 2026)
- GDP rank: 25th (nominal; 2026); 42nd (PPP; 2026)
- GDP growth: 1.5% (2025)
- GDP per capita: ▲$70,680 (nominal; 2026); ▲$77,090 (PPP; 2026)
- GDP per capita rank: 13th (nominal; 2026); 20th (PPP; 2026)
- GDP per capita growth: 1.3% (2025)
- GDP by sector: Agriculture: 1.6%; Industry: 33.0%; Services: 65.4%; (2017)
- Inflation (CPI): 2.6% (2024); 2.0% (2025); 1.5% (2026)
- Population below national poverty line: ▼17.5% at risk of poverty or social exclusion (AROPE 2024)
- Gini coefficient: ▼27.6 low (2024)
- Human Development Index: ▲0.959 very high (2023) (5th); ▲0.886 very high IHDI (9th) (2023)
- Corruption Perceptions Index: ▼80 out of 100 points (2025) (6th)
- Labour force: 5,503,812 (2020, ILO); ▲82.6% employment rate (2023)
- Labour force by occupation: Agriculture: 2%; Industry: 12%; Services: 86%; (2014)
- Unemployment: 8.8% (2025)
- Youth unemployment: ▲24.3% (2025)
- Average gross salary: 42,900 kr / €3,877 monthly (2025)
- Average net salary: 33,522 kr / €3,029 monthly (2025)
- Main industries: Iron and steel; precision equipment (bearings; radio; telephone parts; armaments); pulp and paper; processed foods; motor vehicles

External
- Exports: $185 billion (2025)
- Export goods: Machinery, motor vehicles, paper products, pulp and wood, iron and steel products, chemicals, military armaments
- Main export partners: Germany 10.0%; Norway 9.8%; USA 8.2%; Denmark 6.9%; Finland 6.6%; United Kingdom 5.4%; Netherlands 4.9%; Belgium 4.8%; Poland 4.2%; (2025)
- Imports: $179 billion (2025)
- Import goods: Machinery, petroleum and petroleum products, chemicals, motor vehicles, iron and steel; foodstuffs, clothing
- Main import partners: Germany 16.1%; Netherlands 10.2%; Norway 9.2%; Denmark 6.8%; China 5.4%; Finland 5.2%; Belgium 5.0%; Poland 4.8%; USA 4.5%; (2025)
- FDI stock: $0.5 trillion (31 December 2012 est.)
- Gross external debt: $911 billion (2019)

Public finance
- Government debt: 35.1% of GDP (2019); SEK 1.765 trillion (2019)
- Foreign reserves: $60 billion (31 December 2012 est.)
- Budget balance: SEK 24.8 billion surplus (2019); +0.5% of GDP (2019)
- Revenue: 49.8% of GDP (2019)
- Spending: 49.3% of GDP (2019)
- Economic aid: €1.9 billion from European Structural and Investment Funds (2007–2013); €3.65 billion from European Structural and Investment Funds (2014–2020)
- Credit rating: Standard & Poor's: AAA (Domestic); AAA (Foreign); AAA (T&C Assessment); Outlook: Stable; Moody's: Aaa; Outlook: Stable; Fitch: AAA; Outlook: Stable; Scope: AAA; Outlook: Stable
- All values, unless otherwise stated, are in US dollars.

Sweden has a highly developed social democratic economy, aided by timber, hydropower, and iron ore. These constitute the resource base of an economy oriented toward foreign trade. The main industries include motor vehicles, telecommunications, pharmaceuticals, industrial machines, precision equipment, chemical goods, home goods and appliances, forestry, iron, and steel. Traditionally, Sweden relied on a modern agricultural economy that employed over half the domestic workforce. Today, industries such as engineering, mining, steel, and pulp have been further developed, and have given rise to multi-national companies such as Ericsson, ASEA/ABB, SKF, Alfa Laval, AGA, and Dyno Nobel.

Sweden is a competitive open mixed economy. There is a strong welfare state, with public-sector spending accounting for 49.3% of GDP. In 2014, the percent of national wealth owned by the government was 24%.

Due to Sweden being one of the neutral powers during World War II, it did not have to rebuild its economic base, the banking system, and country as a whole, as did many other European countries. Sweden has achieved a high standard of living under a mixed system of high-tech capitalism and extensive welfare benefits. Sweden has the second highest total tax revenue as a share of GDP, behind only Denmark. As of 2012, the total tax revenue was 44.2% of GDP, down from 48.3% in 2006.

In 2014 the National Institute of Economic research predicted GDP growth of 1.8%, 3.1% and 3.4% in 2014, 2015 and 2016 respectively. A comparison of upcoming economic growth rates of European Union countries revealed that the Baltic states, Poland, and Slovakia are the only countries that are expected to keep comparable or higher growth rates.

== History ==
In the 19th century Sweden evolved from a largely agricultural economy into the beginnings of an industrialized, urbanized country. Poverty remained widespread, prompting a large portion of the country to emigrate, mainly to the United States. Economic reforms and the creation of a modern economic system, banks and corporations were enacted during the later half of the 19th century. During that time Sweden was in a way the "powerhouse" of the Scandinavian region with a strong industrialization process commencing in the 1860s. Moreover, the Swedish Riksdag had developed into a very active Parliament already during the Age of Liberty (1719–72), and this tradition continued into the nineteenth century, laying the basis for the transition towards modern democracy at the end of said century. Apart from relatively high levels of human capital formation, the result of the Reformation and related government policies, such local democratic traditions were the other asset that made the "catching up" of the Scandinavian countries, including Sweden, possible and this economic rise was probably the most remarkable phenomenon in that region during the nineteenth century.

By the 1930s, Sweden had what Life magazine called in 1938 the "world's highest standard of living". Sweden declared itself neutral during both world wars, thereby avoiding much physical destruction and instead, especially after the First World War, profiting from the new circumstances – such as booming demand for raw materials and foodstuffs and the disappearance of international competition for its exports. The postwar boom, that was the continuation of strong inflationary tendencies during the war itself, propelled Sweden to greater economic prosperity. Beginning in the 1970s and culminating with the deep recession of the early 1990s, Swedish standards of living developed less favorably than many other industrialized countries. Since the mid-1990s, the economic performance has improved.

In 2009, Sweden had the world's tenth highest GDP per capita in nominal terms and the fourteenth highest by purchasing power parity.

=== Crisis of the 1990s ===
Sweden has had an economic model in the post-World War II era characterized by close cooperation between the government, labour unions, and corporations. The Swedish economy has extensive and universal social benefits funded by high taxes, close to 50% of GDP. In the 1980s, a real estate and financial bubble formed, driven by a rapid increase in lending. A restructuring of the tax system, in order to emphasize low inflation combined with an international economic slowdown in the early 1990s, caused the bubble to burst. Between 1990 and 1993 GDP went down by 5% and unemployment skyrocketed, causing the worst economic crisis in Sweden since the 1930s. According to an analysis published in Computer Sweden in 1992, the investment level decreased drastically for information technology and computing equipment, except in the financial and banking sector, the part of the industry that created the crisis. The investment levels for IT and computers were restored as early as 1993. In 1992 there was a run on the currency, the central bank briefly jacking up interest to 500% in an unsuccessful effort to defend the currency's fixed exchange rate. Total employment fell by almost 10% during the crisis.

A real estate boom ended in a bust. The government took over nearly a quarter of banking assets at a cost of about 4% of the nation's GDP. This was known colloquially as the "Stockholm Solution". In 2007, the United States Federal Reserve noted, "In the early 1970s, Sweden had one of the highest income levels in Europe; today, its lead has all but disappeared...So, even well-managed financial crises don't really have a happy ending".

The welfare system that had been growing rapidly since the 1970s could not be sustained with a falling GDP, lower employment and larger welfare payments. In 1994 the government budget deficit exceeded 15% of GDP. The response of the government was to cut spending and institute a multitude of reforms to improve Sweden's competitiveness. When the international economic outlook improved combined with a rapid growth in the IT sector, which Sweden was well positioned to capitalize on, the country was able to emerge from the crisis.

The crisis of the 1990s was by some viewed as the end of the much buzzed welfare model called "Svenska modellen", literally "The Swedish Model", as it proved that governmental spending at the levels previously experienced in Sweden was not long-term sustainable in a global open economy. Much of the Swedish Model's acclaimed advantages actually had to be viewed as a result of the post WWII special situation, which left Sweden untouched when competitors' economies were comparatively weak.

However, the reforms enacted during the 1990s seem to have created a model in which extensive welfare benefits can be maintained in a global economy.

In recent years, the Swedish welfare state model has been weakened. Massive privatizations have been carried out since the 1990s, including in public services such as health and education. Inequality has risen sharply, in particular because of a tax system that does not tax wealth and inheritance.

=== Great Recession ===
Sweden entered recession after a two consecutive quarter of economic contraction. Sweden's economy showed zero growth in the second quarter of 2008. The Swedish GDP contracted by 0,1% during both the second and third quarters of 2008. Sweden's economy sank into recession in the third quarter of 2008. In October retail sales dropped 0.6 percent in the month, and household consumption fell 0.2 percent in the third quarter. The Riksbank offered 60 billion kronor ($7.71 billion) in loans to financial firms at an auction, after having opened credit facilities to maintain the liquidity in the banking sector. At the beginning of December, the government launched a financial stability package to rev up the economy, while the central bank, urged by the OECD, cut down its interest rates to 2%

== Contemporary economy ==
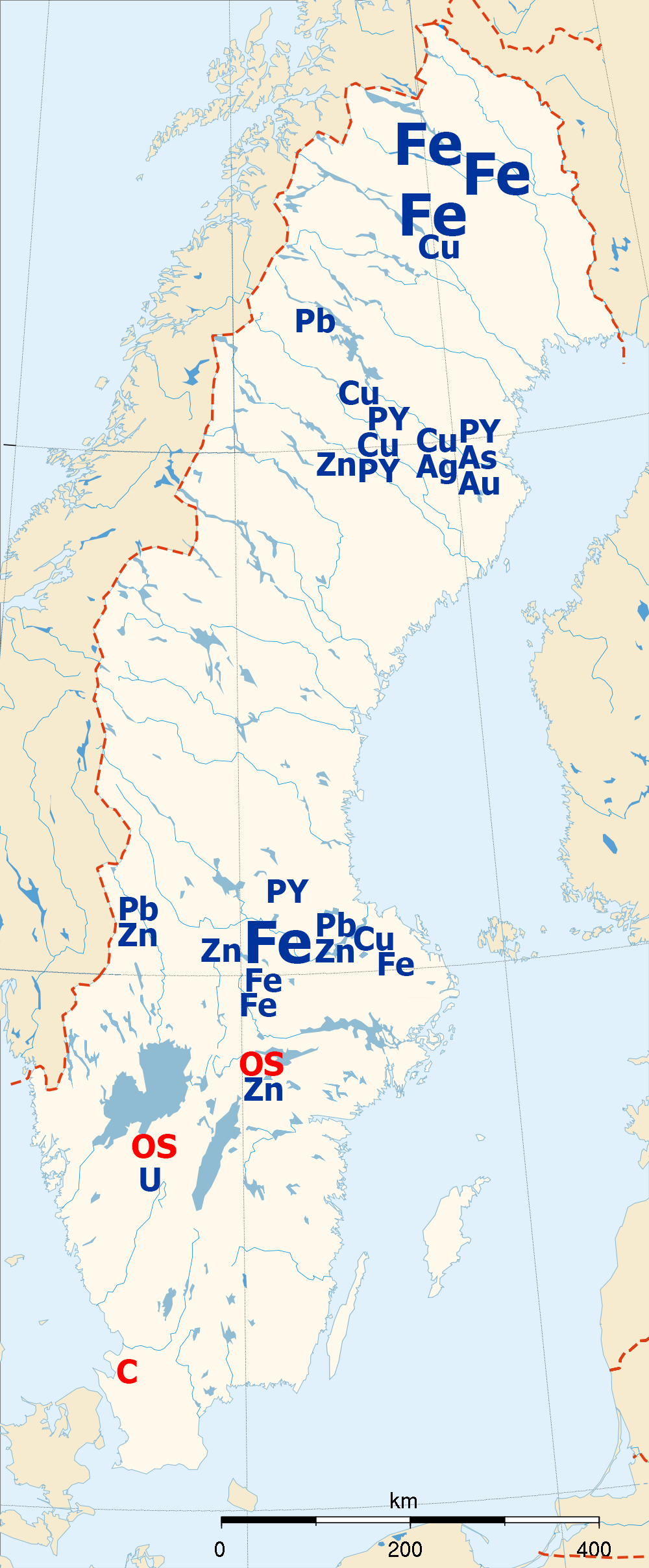
Natural resources of Sweden. Fe – iron ore, PY – pyrite, Cu – copper, Zn – zinc, As – arsenic, Ag – silver, Au – gold, Pb – lead, U – uranium; in red: C – coal, OS – oil shale.

Sweden is an export-oriented mixed economy featuring a modern distribution system, excellent internal and external communications, and a skilled labor force. Timber, hydropower and iron ore constitute the resource base of an economy heavily oriented toward foreign trade. Sweden's engineering sector accounts for 50% of output and exports. Telecommunications, the automotive industry and the pharmaceutical industries are also of great importance. Agriculture accounts for 2 percent of GDP and employment. The armaments industry has a technologically highly advanced reputation.

The 20 largest Sweden-registered companies by turnover as of 2013 were Volvo, Ericsson, Vattenfall, Skanska, Hennes & Mauritz, Electrolux, Volvo Personvagnar, Preem, TeliaSonera, Sandvik, ICA, Atlas Copco, Nordea, Svenska Cellulosa Aktiebolaget, Scania, Securitas, Nordstjernan, SKF, ABB Norden Holding, and Sony Mobile Communications AB.

Some 4.5 million residents are working, out of which around a third have a tertiary education. GDP per hour worked is the world's 9th-highest at US$31 in 2006, compared to US$22 in Spain and US$35 in United States. According to the OECD, deregulation, globalization, and technology-sector growth have been key drivers of productivity. GDP per hour worked is growing 2 1/2 per cent a year for the economy as a whole and trade-terms-balanced productivity growth 2%. Sweden is a world leader in privatized pensions, and pension-funding problems are small compared to many other Western European countries. The Swedish labor market has become more flexible, but it still has some widely acknowledged problems. The typical worker receives only 40% of their income after the tax wedge. The slowly declining overall taxation, 51% of GDP in 2007, is still nearly double of that in the United States or Ireland. Civil servants amount to a third of Swedish workforce, multiple times the proportion in many other countries. Overall, GDP growth has been fast since reforms in the early 1990s, especially in manufacturing.

World Economic Forum 2012–2013 competitiveness index ranks Sweden 4th most competitive. The Index of Economic Freedom 2012 ranks Sweden the 21st most free out of 179 countries, or 10th out of 43 European countries. Sweden ranked 9th in the IMD Competitiveness Yearbook 2008, scoring high in private sector efficiency. According to the book, The Flight of the Creative Class, by the U.S. urban studies, Professor Richard Florida of University of Toronto, Sweden is ranked as having the best creativity in Europe for business and is predicted to become a talent magnet for the world's most purposeful workers. The book compiled an index to measure the kind of creativity it claims is most useful to business – talent, technology and tolerance. Sweden's investment into research and development stood, in 2007, at over 3.5% of GDP. This is considerably higher than that of a number of MEDCs, including the United States, and is the largest among the OECD members.

Sweden rejected the Euro in a referendum in 2003, and Sweden maintains its own currency, the Swedish krona (SEK). The Swedish Riksbank – founded in 1668 and thus making it the oldest central bank in the world – is currently focusing on price stability with its inflation target of 2%. According to Economic Survey of Sweden 2007 by OECD, the average inflation in Sweden has been one of the lowest among European countries since the mid-1990s, largely because of deregulation and quick utilization of globalization.

The largest trade flows are with Germany, United States, Norway, United Kingdom, Denmark and Finland.

The Swedish economic picture has brightened significantly since the severe recession in the early 1990s. Growth has been strong in recent years, and even though the growth in the economy slackened between 2001 and 2003, the growth rate has picked up since with an average growth rate of 3.7% in the last three years. The long-run prospects for growth remain favorable. The inflation rate is low and stable, with projections for continued low levels over the next 2–3 years.

Since the mid-1990s the export sector has been booming, acting as the main engine for economic growth. Swedish exports also have proven to be surprisingly robust. A marked shift in the structure of the exports, where services, the IT industry, and telecommunications have taken over from traditional industries such as steel, paper and pulp, has made the Swedish export sector less vulnerable to international fluctuations. However, at the same time the Swedish industry has received less money for its exports while the import prices have gone up. During the period 1995–2003 the export prices were reduced by 4% at the same time as the import prices climbed by 11%. The net effect is that the Swedish terms-of-trade fell 13%.

By 2014, legislators, economists and the IMF were warning of a bubble with residential property prices soaring and the level of personal mortgage debt expanding. Household debt-to-income rose above 170% as the IMF called on legislators to consider zoning reform and other means of generating a greater supply of housing as demand was outstripping supply. By August 2014, 40% of home borrowers had interest-only loans while those that didn't were repaying principal at a rate that would take 100 years to fully repay.

=== Government ===
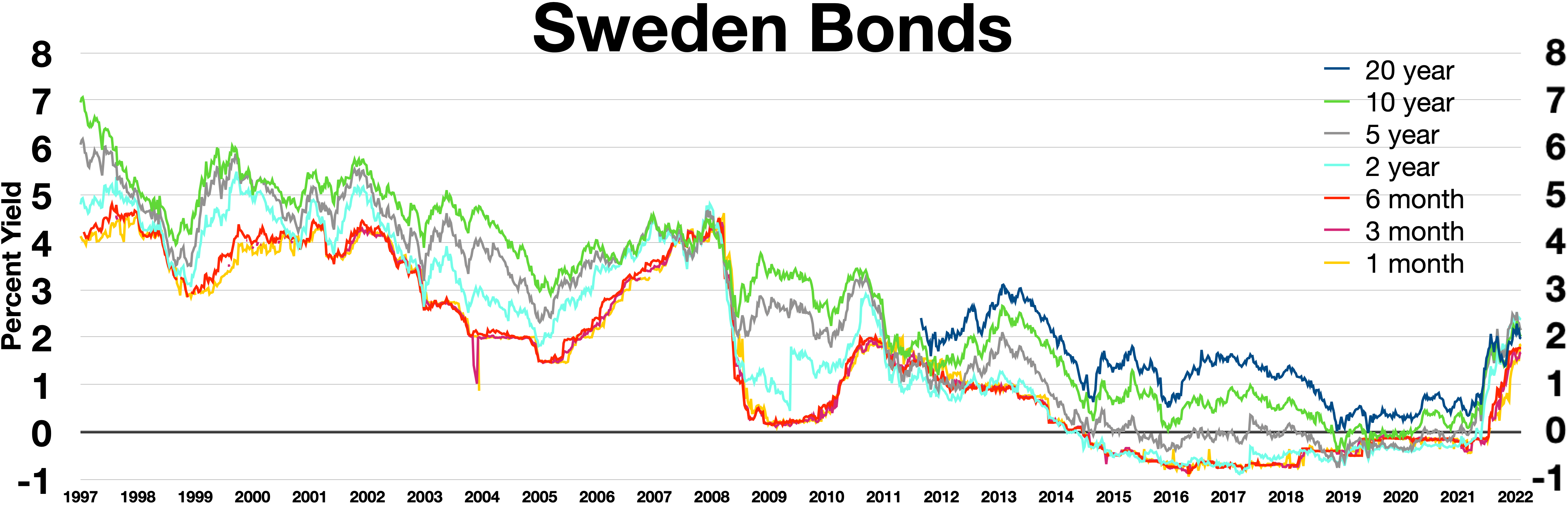
Sweden bonds 20 year 10 year 5 year 2 year 6 month 3 month 1 month

The government budget has improved dramatically from a record deficit of more than 12% of GDP in 1993. In the last decade, from 1998 to present, the government has run a surplus every year, except for 2003 and 2004. The surplus for 2011 is expected to be 99 billion ($15b) kronor. The new, strict budget process with spending ceilings set by the Riksdag, and a constitutional change to an independent Central Bank, have greatly improved policy credibility.

From the perspective of longer-term fiscal sustainability, the long-awaited reform of old-age pensions entered into force in 1999. This entails a far more robust system vis-à-vis adverse demographic and economic trends, which should keep the ratio of total pension disbursements to the aggregate wage bill close to 20% in the decades ahead. Taken together, both fiscal consolidation and pension reform have brought public finances back on a sustainable footing. Gross public debt, which jumped from 43% of GDP in 1990 to 78% in 1994, stabilised around the middle of the 1990s and started to come down again more significantly beginning in 1999. In 2000 it fell below the key level of 60% and had declined to a level of 35% of GDP as of 2010.

==== Taxation ====
Taxation in Sweden on salaries for an employee involves contributing to three different levels of government: the municipality, the county council, and the central government. Social security contributions are paid to finance the social security system.

Income tax on salaries is deducted by the employer (a PAYE system) and paid directly by the employer to the Swedish Tax Agency (Skatteverket).

The effective taxation rate in Sweden is commonly cited as among the highest in the world; see list of countries by tax rates.

Sweden has a taxation system for income from work that combines an income tax (paid by the employee) with social security contributions (employers contributions) that are paid by the employer. The total salary cost for the employer is thereby the gross salary plus the payroll tax. The employer makes monthly preliminary deductions (PAYE) for income tax and also pays the payroll tax to the Swedish Tax Agency.

The income tax is contingent on the person being taxable in Sweden, and the social security contributions are contingent on the person being part of the Swedish social insurance plan. The income tax is finalised through a yearly tax assessment the year following the income year.

27% of taxpayer money in Sweden goes towards education and healthcare, whereas 5% goes to the police and military, and 42% to social security.

=== Companies ===
In 2022, the sector with the highest number of companies registered in Sweden was the services sector with 457,044 companies followed by finance, insurance, and real estate with 184,377 companies. The construction sector is well-developed in Sweden, with significant development in the level of sub-contracting within the industry since the 1980s.

Other major companies headquartered in Sweden include Spotify, IKEA, Mojang, Volvo, Ericsson, H&M, and Scandinavian Airlines.

== Macroeconomic statistics ==
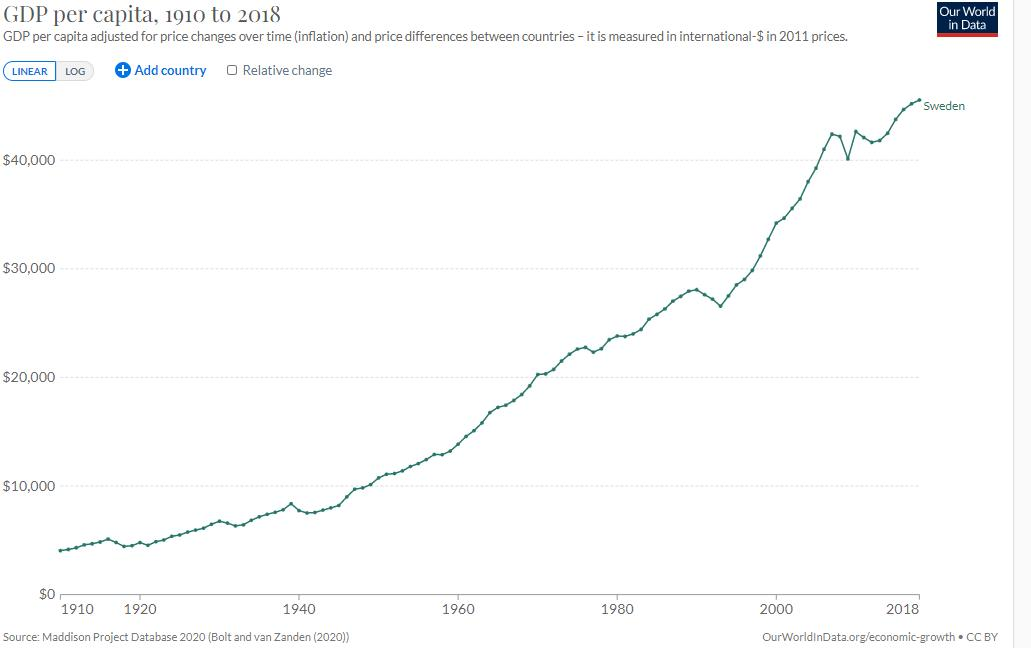
Historical development of real GDP per capita in Sweden

Real GDP growth in Sweden 1996–2006

Exports of Sweden by product category (2019) Chemical products Transportation Machines Mineral products Plastics and rubbers Metals Foodstuffs Precious metals Textiles Instruments Animal products Vegetable products Paper goods Footwear and headwear Miscellaneous Stone and glass Wood products Animal and vegetable bi-products Animal hides Arts and antiques Weapons

The following table shows the main economic indicators in 1980–2021 (with IMF staff estimates in 2022–2027). Inflation under 5% is in green.

Year	GDP (in bn. US$PPP)	GDP per capita (in US$ PPP)	GDP (in bn. US$nominal)	GDP per capita (in US$ nominal)	GDP growth (real)	Inflation rate (in percent)	Unemployment (in percent)	Government debt (in % of GDP)
1980	87.6	10,531.9	140.4	16,877.2	▲4.6%	▲17.5%	2.7%	n/a
1981	▲100.2	▲12,044.3	▼128.1	▼15,396.7	▲4.5%	▲12.1%	▲3.4%	n/a
1982	▲107.9	▲12,960.2	▼113.1	▼13,576.6	▲1.4%	▲8.6%	▲4.3%	n/a
1983	▲114.5	▲13,739.8	▼103.9	▼12,470.9	▲2.1%	▲8.9%	▲4.8%	n/a
1984	▲123.7	▲14,833.2	▲108.3	▲12,976.1	▲4.3%	▲8.0%	▼4.2%	n/a
1985	▲130.6	▲15,629.1	▲113.2	▲13,549.5	▲2.3%	▲7.4%	▼3.9%	n/a
1986	▲137.2	▲16,371.7	▲149.6	▲17,852.7	▲3.0%	▲4.2%	▼3.6%	n/a
1987	▲145.3	▲17,263.6	▲182.0	▲21,629.3	▲3.3%	▲4.2%	▼2.9%	n/a
1988	▲154.1	▲18,216.4	▲205.9	▲24,339.3	▲2.5%	▲5.8%	▼2.4%	n/a
1989	▲164.4	▲19,278.6	▲216.7	▲25,412.2	▲2.7%	▲6.4%	▼2.0%	n/a
1990	▲171.8	▲20,001.0	▲259.9	▲30,253.9	▲0.8%	▲10.5%	▲2.2%	n/a
1991	▲175.7	▲20,322.8	▲272.2	▲31,490.2	▼-1.1%	▲8.8%	▲4.0%	n/a
1992	▲178.0	▲20,478.1	▲283.2	▲32,584.9	▼-0.9%	▲1.4%	▲7.1%	n/a
1993	▲178.9	▼20,455.1	▼213.0	▼24,351.1	▼-1.8%	▲4.7%	▲11.2%	65.7%
1994	▲189.9	▲21,537.6	▲229.0	▲25,978.3	▲3.9%	▲2.9%	▼10.8%	▲68.2%
1995	▲201.5	▲22,799.9	▲267.3	▲30,246.9	▲3.9%	▲2.5%	▼10.4%	▲68.3%
1996	▲208.4	▲23,565.4	▲291.7	▲32,986.1	▲1.6%	▲1.0%	▲10.9%	▲68.7%
1997	▲218.5	▲24,699.1	▼268.1	▼30,307.2	▲3.1%	▲1.8%	▼10.9%	▼67.4%
1998	▲230.5	▲26,034.3	▲270.8	▲30,585.1	▲4.3%	▲1.0%	▼8.8%	▼65.1%
1999	▲243.7	▲27,500.4	▲274.1	▲30,928.6	▲4.2%	▲0.6%	▼7.6%	▼60.1%
2000	▲261.1	▲29,393.1	▼262.8	▼29,589.1	▲4.8%	▲1.3%	▼6.3%	▼50.2%
2001	▲270.8	▲30,400.8	▼242.4	▼27,207.5	▲1.4%	▲2.7%	▼5.8%	▲51.8%
2002	▲281.1	▲31,441.2	▲266.8	▲29,846.2	▲2.2%	▲1.9%	▲6.0%	▼49.8%
2003	▲293.3	▲32,674.8	▲334.3	▲37,249.3	▲2.3%	▲2.3%	▲6.6%	▼49.3%
2004	▲314.2	▲34,868.2	▲385.1	▲42,736.9	▲4.3%	▲1.0%	▲7.4%	▼48.5%
2005	▲333.3	▲36,841.1	▲392.2	▲43,349.9	▲2.9%	▲0.8%	▲7.8%	▲48.8%
2006	▲359.6	▲39,463.0	▲423.1	▲46,425.8	▲4.7%	▲1.5%	▼7.2%	▼43.7%
2007	▲382.1	▲41,605.3	▲491.3	▲53,496.5	▲3.4%	▲1.7%	▼6.3%	▼39.0%
2008	▲387.6	▲41,877.3	▲517.7	▲55,929.9	▼-0.5%	▲3.3%	▲6.4%	▼37.5%
2009	▼373.2	▼39,952.7	▼436.5	▼46,734.9	▼-4.3%	▲1.9%	▲8.5%	▲40.7%
2010	▲400.2	▲42,498.8	▲495.8	▲52,658.8	▲6.0%	▲1.9%	▲8.8%	▼38.1%
2011	▲421.5	▲44,450.3	▲574.1	▲60,540.2	▲3.2%	▲1.4%	▼8.0%	▼37.1%
2012	▲432.5	▲45,258.8	▼552.5	▼57,816.0	▼-0.6%	▲0.9%	▲8.2%	▲37.5%
2013	▲444.6	▲46,098.8	▲586.8	▲60,845.0	▲1.2%	▲0.4%	8.2%	▲40.2%
2014	▲457.5	▲46,936.6	▼582.0	▼59,704.8	▲2.7%	▲0.2%	▼8.1%	▲44.9%
2015	▲481.3	▲48,857.9	▼505.1	▼51,274.3	▲4.5%	▲0.7%	▼7.6%	▼43.7%
2016	▲500.4	▲50,061.6	▲515.7	▲51,590.5	▲2.1%	▲1.1%	▼7.2%	▼42.3%
2017	▲530.4	▲52,413.1	▲541.0	▲53,459.1	▲2.6%	▲1.9%	▼6.9%	▼40.7%
2018	▲553.7	▲54,123.6	▲555.5	▲54,295.7	▲2.0%	▲2.0%	▼6.5%	▼38.9%
2019	▲574.8	▲55,656.2	▼533.9	▼51,694.5	▲2.0%	▲1.7%	▲7.0%	▼34.9%
2020	▼569.1	▼54,830.0	▲547.1	▲52,706.3	▼-2.2%	▲0.7%	▲8.5%	▲39.2%
2021	▲622.8	▲59,587.3	▲635.7	▲60,815.5	▲5.1%	▲2.7%	▲8.8%	▼36.8%
2022	▲684.5	▲63,877.4	▼603.9	▼56,361.4	▲2.6%	▲7.2%	▼7.6%	▼33.5%
2023	▲707.9	▲65,459.2	▲654.0	▲60,473.0	▼-0.1%	▲8.4%	▼7.4%	▼31.2%
2024	▲738.2	▲67,666.3	▲693.2	▲63,533.9	▲2.1%	▲3.5%	▼7.3%	▼28.8%
2025	▲769.4	▲69,935.3	▲732.6	▲66,594.4	▲2.3%	▲2.3%	▼7.2%	▼26.9%
2026	▲799.2	▲72,080.3	▲769.9	▲69,435.1	▲1.9%	▲2.0%	7.2%	▼25.5%
2027	▲830.7	▲74,376.1	▲808.7	▲72,405.1	▲2.0%	▲2.0%	7.2%	▼24.2%

== Economic and monetary union ==
Current economic development reflects a quite remarkable improvement of the Swedish economy since the crisis in 1991–93, so that Sweden could easily qualify for membership in the third phase of the Economic and Monetary Union of the European Union, adopting the euro as its currency. In theory, by the rules of the EMU, Sweden is obliged to join, since the country has not obtained exception by any protocol or treaty (as opposed to Denmark and the United Kingdom). Nevertheless, the Swedish government decided in 1997 against joining the common currency from its start on 1 January 1999. This choice was implemented by exploiting a legal loophole, deliberately staying out of the European Exchange Rate Mechanism. This move is currently tolerated by the European Central Bank, which however has warned that this would not be the case for newer EU members.

In the first years of the twenty-first century, a majority for joining emerged in the governing Social Democratic party, although the question was subject of heated debate, with leading personalities in the party on both sides. On 14 September 2003, a national referendum was held on the euro. A 56% majority of Swedes rejected the common currency, while 42% voted in favour of it. Currently no plans for a new referendum or parliamentary vote on the matter are being discussed, though it has been implied that another referendum may take place in around ten years.

== Sectors ==
=== Agriculture ===
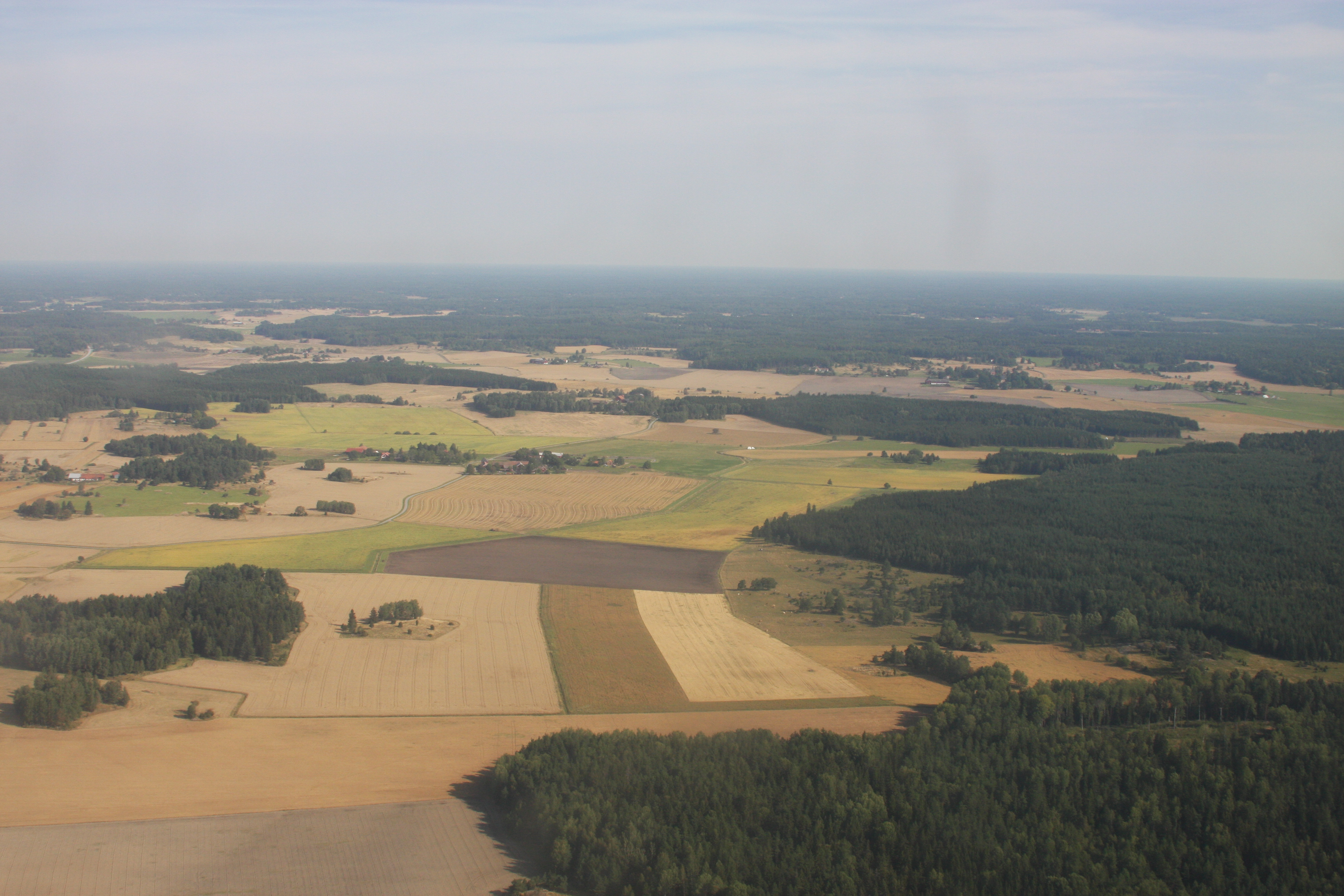
Mixed arable and woodland areas in Sigtuna Municipality, close to Arlanda Airport.

Köppen climate classifications applied to Sweden. Tundra (grey), Sub-arctic (dark blue), Humid Continental (light blue), Oceanic (green).

Agriculture in Sweden differs by region. This is due to different soils and different climate zones, with many parts of the country being more suitable to forestry. It makes more economic sense to dedicate land to forestry than agriculture in the northern and mountainous parts of the country.

The southern tip of Sweden is the most agriculturally productive region. Sweden has quite short growing seasons in most parts of the country and that limits the species and productivity of agriculture. The south has the longest growing season, which in some parts of the south is in excess of 240 days. Wheat, rapeseed and other oil plants, together with sugar beet are common in southern Sweden, while barley and oat are more important further north. Barley and oats are grown mostly for animal feed, especially for pigs and poultry. The Central Swedish lowland is the traditional centre of agriculture in Sweden. Historically, agriculture has been one of the principal sectors of the Swedish economy.

Agricultural production statistics are available online. In the 21st century the Swedish government has committed to securing elimination of carbon emissions from the agricultural industry by 2030.

The food production represented by fishing and aquaculture is not significant in economic terms to the Swedish economy as a whole. However, these activities are important to coastal towns.

=== Industries ===
==== Automotive ====
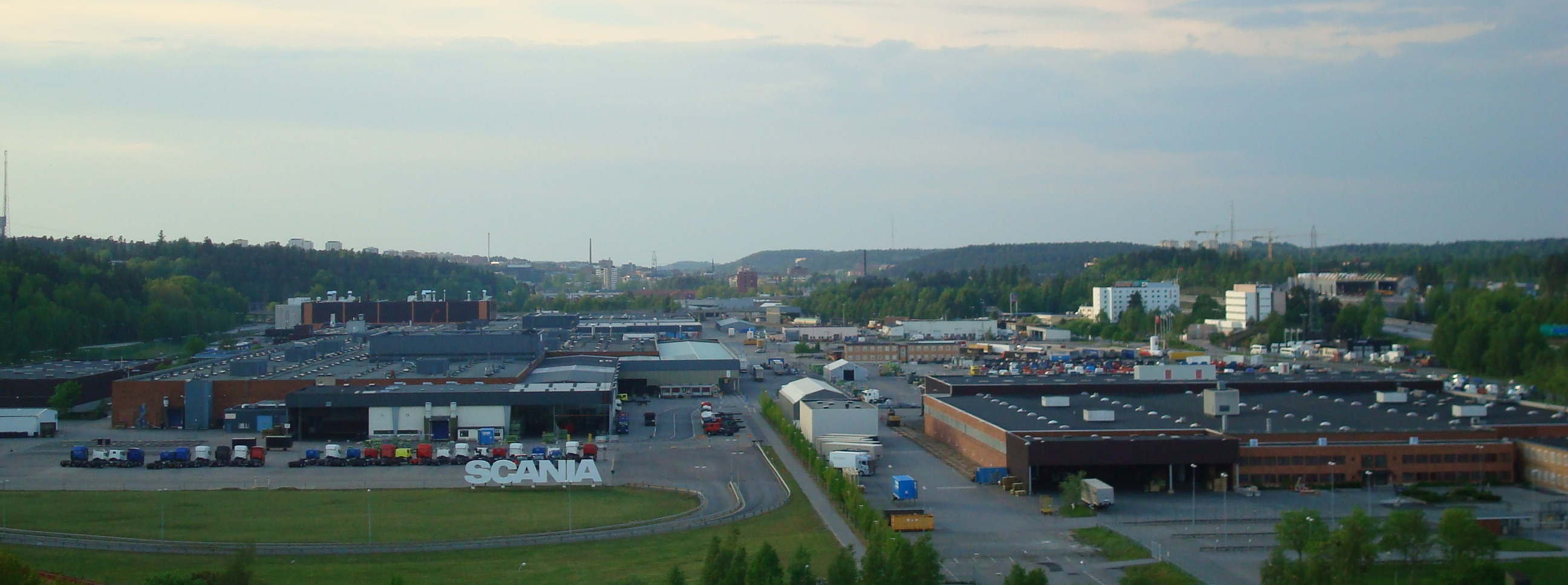
Scania's truck plant in Södertälje.

The automotive industry in Sweden is mainly associated with passenger car manufacturers Volvo Cars and Saab Automobile but Sweden is also home of two of the largest truck manufacturers in the world: AB Volvo and Scania AB. The automotive industry is heavily dependent on export as some 85 percent of the passenger cars and 95 percent of the heavy vehicles are sold outside of Sweden. The automotive industry and its sub-contractors is a major part of Swedish industry. In 2011 around 110,000 people were employed and the export income of 150 billion SEK accounted for 12 per cent of Sweden's export income. During 2009 128,738 passenger cars and 27,698 heavy vehicles were built in Sweden. Koenigsegg is also a famous Swedish company which makes some of the fastest cars in the world, but also some of the most expensive. They currently produce models such as the Jesko, Gemera, and CC850.

==== Mining ====
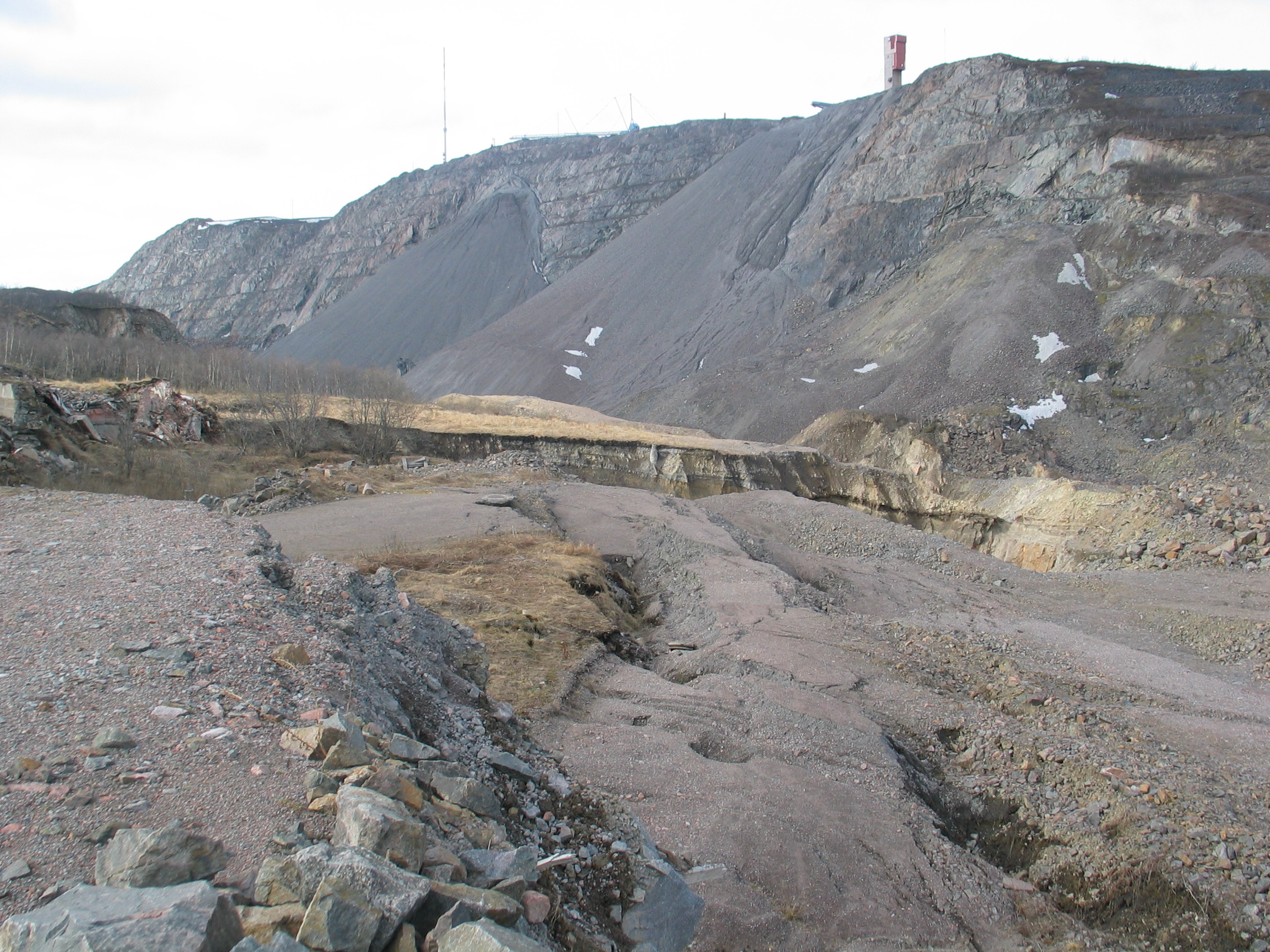
Kiruna iron ore mine in Kiruna, Norrbotten County

The mining industry in Sweden has a history dating back 6,000 years.

Historically, Sweden's most famous mine is the copper Falun Mine in Dalarna, which made a significant contribution to the Swedish economy for several centuries. Sweden today is one of the largest sources of iron ore in Europe, with approximately 90% of Europe's iron and 5% of the world's iron reserves.

=== Energy ===
Historical energy consumption in Sweden by source. Renewables and nuclear is given as the electricity produced.

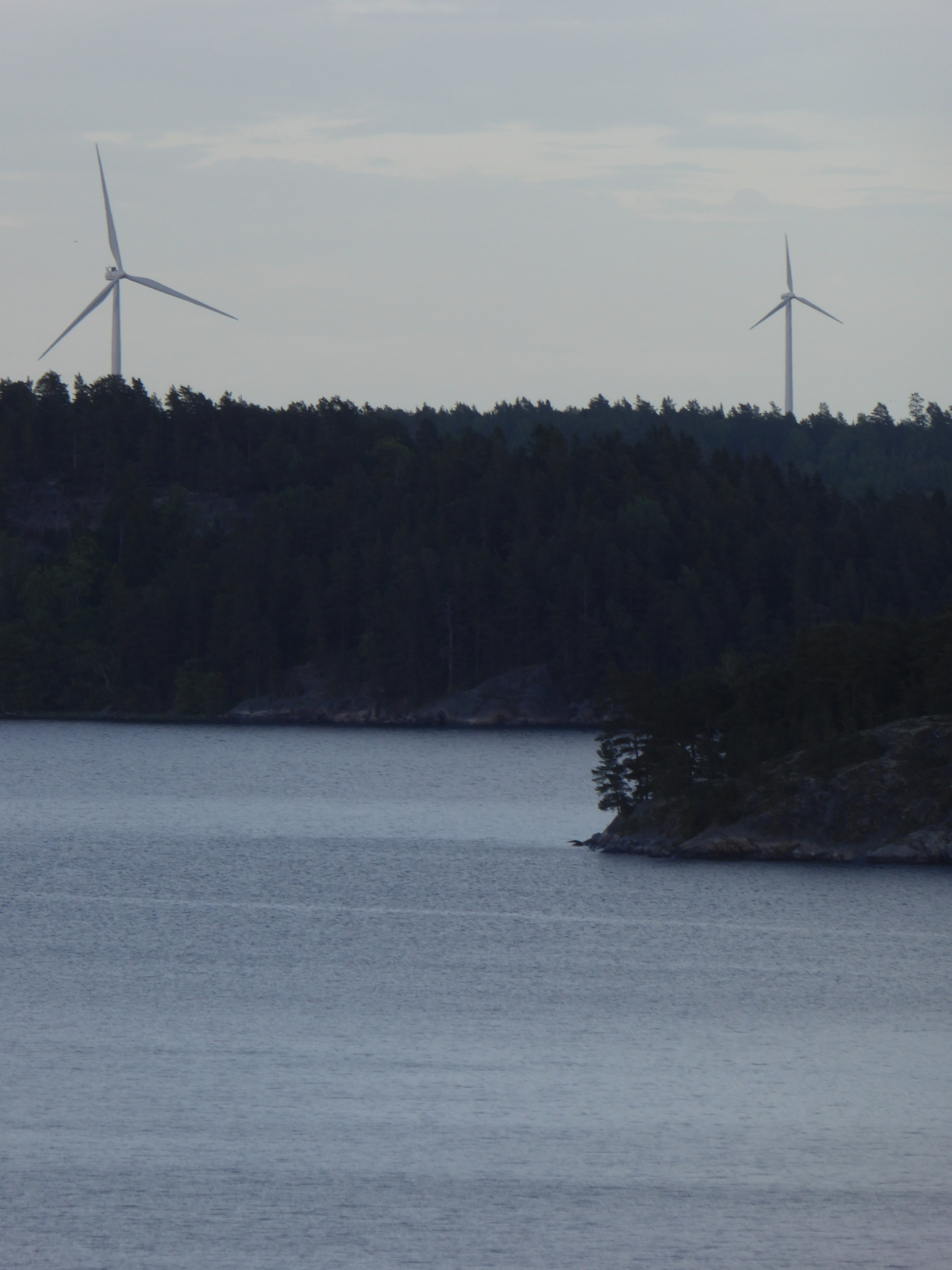
Wind turbines in Sweden

Energy in Sweden is characterized by relatively high per capita production and consumption, and a reliance on imports for fossil fuel supplies.

With 98% of electricity generation coming from renewables and nuclear in 2023, the electric grid is nearing zero emissions. Sweden is also a major net exporter of electricity, exporting over 20% of national electricity generation to the rest of Europe in 2023.

A high carbon tax on heating fuels has contributed to a noticeable uptake in biomass and electricity usage in the heating/cooling sector, with Eurostat reporting Sweden had the highest share of renewable energy for heating and cooling in the EU, at 69% (2022).

By contrast, the transport sector (especially plane fuel and automobiles) remain majority-powered by fossil fuels, a challenge for the government's 2045 target of carbon neutrality. Nevertheless, sustainability measures have reduced total emissions in Sweden, even as the population has increased; at 3.6 tonnes per person, Sweden's 2022 per capita Carbon dioxide (CO_{2}) emissions are 45% lower than 1990 levels and below the world average.

Eurostat data (2022) shows 66% of Sweden's total final energy consumption comes from renewables, broken down as 83.3% in electricity consumption, 69.4% in heating and cooling, and 29.2% in transport.

==== Electricity ====
Majority of electricity production in Sweden relies on hydro power and nuclear power. In 2008 the consumption of electricity in Sweden was 16018 kWh per capita, compared to EU average 7409 kWh per capita. Sweden has a national grid, which is part of the Synchronous grid of Northern Europe. A specialty of the Nordic energy market is the existence of so-called electricity price areas, which complicate the wholesale Nordic energy market.

The electricity supply and consumption were about equal in 2006–2009: 124–146 TWh/year (14–17 GW). In 2009 the electricity supply included hydro power 65 TWh (53%), nuclear power 50 TWh (40%) and net import 5 TWh (3%). The Swedish use of electricity declined by 14% in 2009. Potential factors may include recession and the forest- and automobile-industry changes.

The industrial structural changes may have long-term influence in the electricity sector in Sweden. For example, Stora Enso has moved some pulp and paper production from Scandinavia to Brazil and China. The net energy change of investments depends on energy choices in Brazil and China.

=== Services ===
==== Education ====
Education in Sweden is mandatory for children between ages 5/6 and 15/16 depending on the time of year they were born. The school year in Sweden runs from mid-late August to early/mid-June. The Christmas holiday from mid-December to early January divides the Swedish school year into two terms.

Preschool is free for all families. The year children turn six they start the compulsory preschool class (förskoleklass), which acts as a transition phase between preschool and comprehensive schools. Children between ages 5/6 and 15/16 attend comprehensive school where a wide range of subjects are studied. All students study the same subjects, with exception for different language choices. The majority of schools are run municipally, but there are also privately owned schools, known as independent schools.

Almost all students continue studying in three-year-long upper secondary schools where most students choose one out of 18 national programmes, some of which are vocational and some preparatory. For students not fulfilling the requirements for the national programmes, introductory programmes are available where students work to satisfy the requirements for the national programmes. In 2018, 16% of students finishing year 9 of comprehensive school were not eligible for national programmes.

The higher education system is compatible with the rest of Europe through the Bologna Process where degrees are divided into three cycles: basic level, advanced level and doctoral level. There are two degrees available in each cycle of different lengths. Universities have no tuition fees for Swedish citizens (as well for citizens of European Economic Area countries), and student aid is available from the government.

==== Healthcare ====
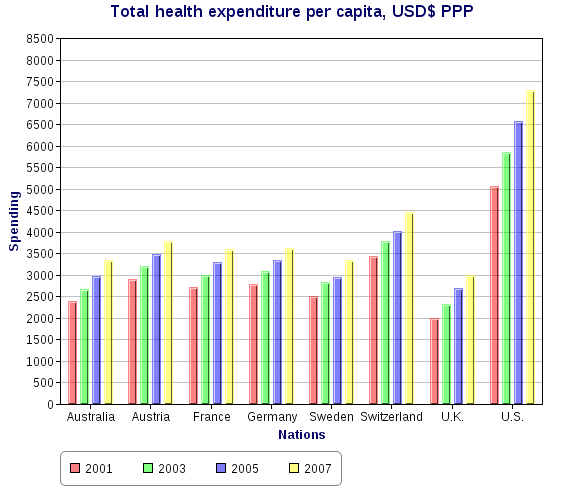
Total health spending per capita, in U.S. dollars PPP-adjusted, of Sweden compared amongst various other first world nations.

The Swedish health care system is mainly government-funded, universal for all citizens and decentralized, although private health care also exists. The health care system in Sweden is financed primarily through taxes levied by county councils and municipalities. A total of 21 councils are in charge with primary and hospital care within the country.

Private healthcare is a rarity in Sweden, and even those private institutions work under the mandated city councils. The city councils regulate the rules and the establishment of potential private practices. Although in most countries care for the elderly or those who need psychiatric help is conducted privately, in Sweden local, publicly funded authorities are in charge of this type of care.

==== Telecommunications ====
This article covers telecommunications in Sweden.

==== Tourism ====
Tourism in Sweden comprised a relatively small part of the Swedish economy in 2011 at 2.9% of the country's GDP; at this time, tourism generated 264 billion Swedish krona, 98.8 billion of which was foreign-visitor expenditure in Sweden. 7.1% of Swedish household income is spent on domestic tourism.

Tourist arrivals of 2024 in %

One well-known tourist route is via train from southern to northern Sweden, viewing historical, natural and cultural attractions. This route is particularly popular among German tourists.

According to the CIA World Factbook, Sweden was the 21st most-visited country in the world, with 7,627,000 arrivals in 2006.

=== Transport ===
Transport in Sweden is available for all four main modes of transport—air, bus, ferry and rail—assisting residents and visitors without their own vehicle to travel around much of Sweden's 450,295 square kilometres (173,860 sq mi).

=== Water supply and sanitation ===
Sweden provides safe drinking water and advanced sanitation to nearly 100% of its population. Local municipalities manage and own the public water and wastewater infrastructure, funding operations through user fees. Water sources comprise surface water from lakes and rivers, natural groundwater and artificially infiltrated groundwater.

== Science and technology ==
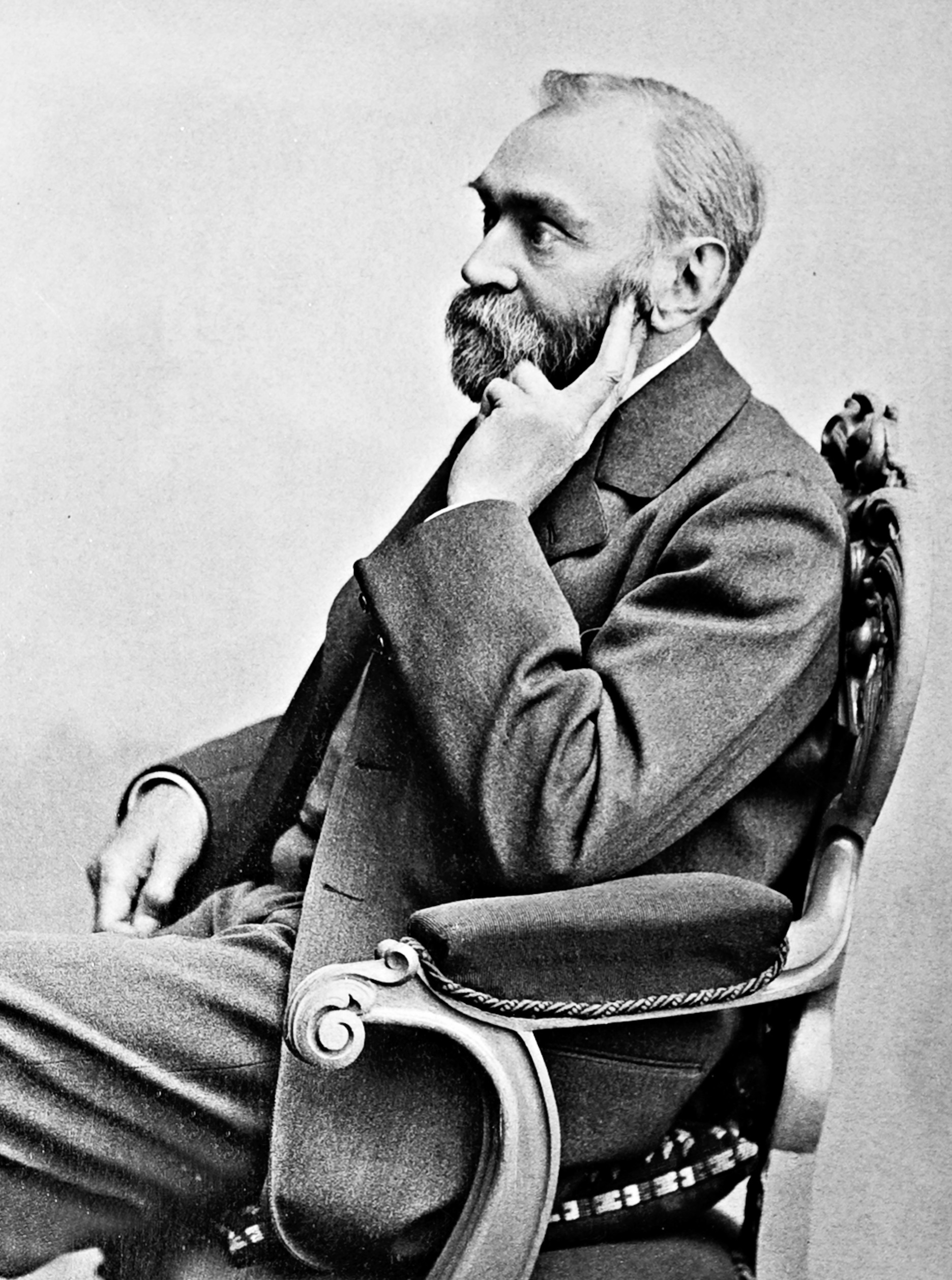
Alfred Nobel, inventor of dynamite and institutor of the Nobel Prize

In the 18th century, Sweden's Scientific Revolution took off. Previously, technical progress had mainly come from mainland Europe.

In 1739, the Royal Swedish Academy of Sciences was founded, with people such as Carl Linnaeus and Anders Celsius as early members. Gustaf Dalén founded AGA, and received the Nobel Prize for his sun valve. Alfred Nobel invented dynamite and instituted the Nobel Prizes. Lars Magnus Ericsson started the company bearing his name, Ericsson, still one of the largest telecom companies in the world. Jonas Wenström was an early pioneer in alternating current and is along with Nikola Tesla credited as one of the inventors of the three-phase electrical system.

The traditional engineering industry is still a major source of Swedish inventions, but pharmaceuticals, electronics and other high-tech industries are gaining ground. Tetra Pak was an invention for storing liquid foods, invented by Erik Wallenberg. Losec, an ulcer medicine, was the world's best-selling drug in the 1990s and was developed by AstraZeneca. More recently Håkan Lans invented the Automatic Identification System, a worldwide standard for shipping and civil aviation navigation. A large portion of the Swedish economy is to this day based on the export of technical inventions.

Swedish inventors held 47,112 patents in the United States in 2014, according to the United States Patent and Trademark Office. As a nation, only ten other countries hold more patents than Sweden.

Combined, the public and the private sector in Sweden allocate over 3.5% of GDP to research & development (R&D) per year, making Sweden's investment in R&D as a percentage of GDP the second-highest in the world. For several decades the Swedish government has prioritised scientific and R&D activities. As a percentage of GDP, the Swedish government spends the most of any nation on research and development. Sweden tops other European countries in the number of published scientific works per capita.

The European Spallation Source (ESS) was scheduled to begin initial operations in 2019 with construction completion scheduled for 2025. The ESS will give an approximately 30 times stronger neutron beam than any of today's existing neutron source installations.

== Labour force ==
The traditionally low wage differential has increased in recent years as a result of increased flexibility as the role of wage setting at the company level has strengthened somewhat. Still, Swedish unskilled employees are well paid while well educated Swedish employees are low-paid compared with those in competitor countries in Western Europe and the US. The average increases in real wages in recent years have been high by historical standards, in large part due to unforeseen price stability. Even so, nominal wages in recent years have been slightly above those in competitor countries. Thus, while private-sector wages rose by an average annual rate of 3.75% from 1998 to 2000 in Sweden, the comparable increase for the EU area was 1.75%. In the year 2000 the total labour force was around 4.4 million people.

== Unemployment ==
In contrast with most other European countries, Sweden maintained an unemployment rate around 2% or 3% of the work force throughout the 1980s. This was, however, accompanied by high and accelerating inflation. It became evident that such low unemployment rates were not sustainable, and in the severe crisis of the early 1990s the rate increased to more than 8%. In 1996 the government set out a goal of reducing unemployment to 4% by 2000. During 2000 employment rose by 90,000 people, the greatest increase in 40 years, and the goal was reached in the autumn of 2000. The same autumn the government set out its new target: that 80% of the working age population will have a regular job by 2004. Some have expressed concern that meeting the employment target may come at a cost of too high a rate of wage increases hence increasing inflation. However, as of August 2006, roughly 5% of working age Swedes were unemployed, over the government-established goal. However, some of the people who cannot find work are put away in so-called "labour market political activities", referred to as "AMS-åtgärder".

According to Jan Edling, a former trade-unionist, the actual number of unemployed is far higher, and those figures are being suppressed by both the government and the Swedish Trade Union Confederation. In Edling's report he added that a further 3% of Swedes were occupied in state-organised job schemes, not in the private sector. He also claimed a further 700,000 Swedes are either on long-term sick leave or in early retirement. Edling asks how many of these people are in fact unemployed. According to his report, the "actual unemployment" rate hovers near 20%. Some critics disagree with this concept of "actual" unemployment, also termed "broad unemployment", since they do not see e.g. students who rather want a job, people on sick leave and military conscripts as "unemployed".

According to Swedish Statistics, unemployment in June 2013 was 9.1% in the general population and 29% amongst 15- to 25-year-olds.

== Trade unions ==
Around seventy percent of the Swedish labour force is unionised. For most unions there is a counterpart employer's organization for businesses. The unions and employer organisations are independent of both the government and political parties, although the largest confederation of unions, the National Swedish Confederation of Trade Unions or LO (organising blue-collar workers), maintains close links to one of the three major parties, the Social Democrats.

The unionisation rate among white-collar workers is exceptionally high in Sweden – since 2008 higher than for blue-collar workers. In 2023, blue-collar density was 58%, and white-collar density was 73% (full-time students working part-time excluded). Just before the considerably raised fees to union unemployment funds in January 2007, blue-collar and white-collar union density was the same (77% in 2006). The average union density was 70% in the years 2011–2014, 69% in 2015-2017 and 68% in 2018 and 2019. There are two major confederations that organise professionals and other qualified employees: the Swedish Confederation of Professional Employees (Tjänstemännens Centralorganisation or TCO) and the Swedish Confederation of Professional Associations (Sveriges Akademikers Centralorganisation or SACO). They are both independent from Sweden's political parties and never endorse candidates for office in political elections.

There is no minimum wage that is required by legislation. Instead, minimum wage standards in different sectors are normally set by collective bargaining. About 90% of all workers are covered by collective agreements, in the private sector 83% (2018). The high coverage of collective agreements is achieved despite the absence of state mechanisms extending collective agreements to whole industries or sectors. This reflects the dominance of self-regulation (regulation by the labour market parties themselves) over state regulation in Swedish industrial relations.

Sweden has not joined the EMU (the Economic and Monetary Union / the Euro) and will not in the foreseeable future. When the issue was at the agenda, the Swedish union movement was very split. In contrast to the very positive attitude of employers' associations, the union rank-and file opinion was so split that several unions, as well as the confederations LO, TCO and SACO, abstained from taking an official position.

== Income inequality and alleviation ==
Sweden has moderate income inequality and a generally high standard of living. Unemployment was 9% as of 2026, one of the highest unemployment rates in the EU. The Nordic model of a social welfare society exemplified by Sweden and its near neighbours provides social welfare and includes many unemployment benefits for the poor, and amply funded health, housing and social security provision, within essentially corruption free nations subscribing to principles of a measure of openness of information about government activity. Income inequality in Sweden ranks as moderate in the Gini coefficient index, being 29.3 as of 2023 with inequality rising sharply since 2021.

Swedes pay very high taxes, some 52.1% of GDP (2014 est.) but correspondingly enjoy a very generous universal welfare state. Sweden's highest earning households have a somewhat lower share of income capital when compared to other countries; with the highest earning 10% having 24% of income or consumption (compared to the US, in which the highest earning 10% percent have 30% of income or consumption and Germany, have 24%, while Norway has 21.2%), and very low absolute poverty rates. However, more recent studies have shown the wealth gap to be growing in Sweden. In 2018 a leading Swiss bank claimed that in Sweden the highest 10% have 60-70% of the nation's wealth. The wealth inequality highlighted by the bank is accumulated wealth, not income inequality. Other studies have shown that the top 10% made 90% of 'capital income.' but still maintaining relatively low poverty rates. Ranked by inequality in accumulated wealth, Sweden is the 12th most unequal nation in the world as of 2021.

== Welfare and pensions ==
Social welfare in Sweden is made up of several organizations and systems dealing with welfare. It is mostly funded by taxes, and executed by the public sector on all levels of government as well as private organizations. It can be separated into three parts falling under three different ministries. Social welfare is the responsibility of the Ministry of Health and Social Affairs. Education is the responsibility of the Ministry of Education and Research. The labour market is the responsibility of the Ministry of Employment.

== Ongoing and finished privatisations ==
The Swedish government has announced that it will privatise a number of wholly and partly state owned companies. "The income from these sales will be used to pay off the government debt and reduce the burden of debt for future generations. The Government's ambition was to sell companies to a value of SEK 200 billion during 2007–2010."

Ongoing privatisations

- Telia Sonera – telecom. 37.3% owned by the Swedish government. Hitherto SEK 18 billion worth of shares has been sold reducing state ownership from 45.3% to 37.3%.
- SAS Group – airline. 14.8% owned by the Swedish government. On 13 October 2016 the Swedish government sold 13.8 million shares worth 213.9 million SEK. The Minister of Enterprise, Mikael Damberg stated that "There exists good reasons for the Swedish government not be a long-term owner of a publicly traded airline... This sell-off is a first step towards reducing the Swedish government's ownership in a responsible manner."

Completed privatisations

- OMX – stock exchange. Shares sold to Borse Dubai for 2.1 billion SEK.
- Vin & Sprit. Sold to Pernod Ricard for 5.6 billion Euro.
- Vasakronan. Sold to AP Fastigheter for 4.3 billion Euro.
- Nordea – bank. 19.5% owned by Swedish government. Last government-held block of shares was sold in September 2013.

== See also ==
- List of Swedish counties by GDP
- List of municipalities of Sweden by wealth
- Corruption in Sweden
- Private
  - List of companies of Sweden
  - List of largest Swedish companies
  - List of Swedish billionaires by net worth
- Government
  - Central bank ("Sveriges Riksbank")
  - Currency ("krona", "kronor" in plural)
  - List of Swedish government enterprises
  - Ministry of Finance (Sweden)
  - Ministry of Rural Affairs and Infrastructure (Sweden)
  - Financial Supervisory Authority (Sweden)
  - Swedish Fiscal Policy Council
  - Swedish National Debt Office
  - Swedish National Institute of Economic Research
  - Swedish National Financial Management Authority
- Unions
  - Confederation of Swedish Enterprise (Svenskt Näringsliv)
  - Swedish Confederation of Professional Associations (SACO)
  - Swedish Confederation of Professional Employees (TCO)
  - Swedish Trade Union Confederation (LO)

Other links

- Nordic model
- Economy of the European Union
- Economy of Europe
- Copyright law of Sweden
- History of copper currency in Sweden
