= Epad =

EPAD may refer to:

- Electricity Price Area Differential, a financial product
- a simple text editor written in Elementary and Python
- Établissement public pour l'aménagement de la région de la Défense (EPAD), a French public industrial and commercial establishment concerned with La Défense, a business district near Paris
