= Electricity sector in Sweden =

Historical electricity production in Sweden by source

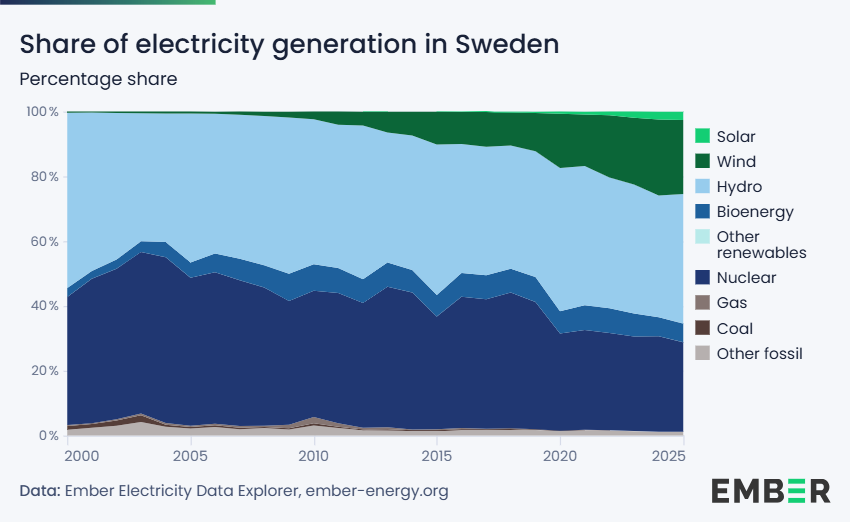
Share of electricity generation in Sweden - percentage share

Majority of electricity production in Sweden relies on hydro power and nuclear power. In 2008 the consumption of electricity in Sweden was 16018 kWh per capita, compared to EU average 7409 kWh per capita. Sweden has a national grid, which is part of the Synchronous grid of Northern Europe. A specialty of the Nordic energy market is the existence of so-called electricity price areas, which complicate the wholesale Nordic energy market.

The electricity supply and consumption were about equal in 2006–2009: 124–146 TWh/year (14–17 GW). In 2009 the electricity supply included hydro power 65 TWh (53%), nuclear power 50 TWh (40%) and net import 5 TWh (3%). The Swedish use of electricity declined by 14% in 2009. Potential factors may include recession and the forest- and automobile-industry changes.

The industrial structural changes may have long-term influence in the electricity sector in Sweden. For example, Stora Enso has moved some pulp and paper production from Scandinavia to Brazil and China. The net energy change of investments depends on energy choices in Brazil and China.

Electricity in Sweden (TWh)
Year	Use	Produce	Import*	Hydro	Nuclear	Wind	Other*
1980	94.5	94.0	0.5	58.0	25.3	n.a.	10.7
1990	139.9	141.7	−1.8	71.4	65.2	0.0	5.0
1995	142.4	144.1	−1.7	67.2	67.0	0.1	9.8
2000	146.6	142.0	4.7	77.8	54.8	0.5	8.9
2005	147.1	154.5	−7.4	71.9	69.5	0.9	12.2
2006	146.4	140.3	6.1	61.2	65.0	1.0	13.1
2007	146.4	145.1	1.3	65.7	64.3	1.4	13.6
2008	144.2	146.2	−2.0	68.8	61.3	2.0	14.1
2009	138.2	133.5	4.7	65.1	50.0	2.5	15.9
2010	147.0	145.0	2.1	66.7	55.6	3.5	19.1
2011	140.3	147.6	−7.2	66.6	58.0	6.1	16.8
2012	142.9	162.5	−19.6	78.4	61.4	7.2	15.5
2013	139.3	149.2	−10.0	60.9	63.6	9.8	14.8
2014	134.4	150.0	−15.6	63.3	62.2	11.2	13.2
2015	136.3	158.9	−22.6	74.8	54.3	16.3	13.5
2016	140.6	152.3	−11.7	61.7	60.5	15.5	14.6
2017	141.2	160.2	−19.0	64.6	63.0	17.6	15.0
2018	141	158	−17	61	66	17	15
2019	138.3	164.4	−26.2	64.6	64.3	19.9	15.6
2020	134.7	159.7	−25.0	71.2	47.3	27.6	13.6
2021	139.9	165.5	−25.6	70.6	51.0	27.4	16.6
* Other = production without hydro, nuclear, wind; Import = import minus export

== Electricity per person and by power source ==
As of November 2021, Swedish authorities have not published "Electricity production by power source in different countries" after the year 2019.

Electricity per person in Sweden (kWh/ hab.)
	Use	Production	Import/export	Imp./exp. %	Fossil	Nuclear	Nuc. %	Other RE*	Bio + waste	Wind	Non-RE use*	RE %*
2004	16,633	16,878	−245	−1.5	580	8,620	51.8	6,789	890		8,954	46.2
2005	16,726	17,546	−819	−4.9	431	8,016	47.9	8,174	926		7,626	54.4
2006	16,474	16,266	208	1.3	572	7,314	44.4	7,383	997		8,094	50.9
2008	16,018	16,225	−206	−1.3	527	6,922	43.2	7,687	1,088		7,243	54.8
2009	14,881	14,375	506	3.4	431	5,382	36.2	7,008*	1,281	269*	6,323	57.5
* Other RE is hydro power, solar and geothermal electricity and windpower until 2008 * Non-RE use = use – production of renewable electricity RE % = (production of RE / use) × 100% Note: EU calculates the share of renewable energies in gross electrical consumption

== By power source ==
=== Nuclear power ===
Nuclear power in Sweden includes Forsmark Nuclear Power Plant and Ringhals Nuclear Power Plant and Oskarshamn Nuclear Power Plant, with a total of ten reactors. Swedish nuclear power is owned by the state company Vattenfall, Finnish Fortum and German E.ON. The competition authorities and OECD have criticized the joint ownership. Swedish people voted for phase-out of nuclear power plants on 23 March 1980. The outcome of the vote was that the nuclear reactors will be phased out at a feasible rate. In 1980 the Riksdag decided that nuclear energy would be phased out by 2010. Barsebäck 1 nuclear reactor was shut in 1999 and Barsebäck 2 in 2005. Ringhals Nuclear Power Plant reactors 3 and 4 are expected to remain in service until the 2040s.

Sweden imports uranium from Australia, Canada, Russia and Namibia. Vattenfall imports from Namibia and E.ON from Canada and Russia.

The import of uranium by Vattenfall has been criticized in the Swedish media and the Parliament e.g. on 23 March 2010. Vattenfall imports uranium from Namibia, Rössing Uranium Mine owned by Rio Tinto. Rössing Mine do not allow any visitors in the mine area and do not answer any questions concerning the employee health and safety and environmental protection. In 2008 SOMO, the Netherlands, made a health study of the mine workers in Namibia. Vattenfall had not made any official controls for six years in 2010.

=== Wind power ===
In 2008 Wind power was produced 2 TWh. As of 2008, Sweden produced 1.6% of electricity with wind power. The European average was 4.1%. [6] At the end of 2010 installed wind capacity met 3.2% of Swedish and 5.3% of the EU’s electricity needs. According to the Swedish National Action Plan (2010) for the European Union 2009 Renewable Energy Directive the Swedish government plan is 8% wind power of electricity (12.5 TWh) in 2020.

The Swedish Energy Agency recommended in 2007 a target of 30 TWh of wind power in 2020. The annual electricity use was in average 146 TWh in 2000–2009. According to the Swedish National Action Plan (2010) the electricity use will be 156 TWh in 2020 giving 7% rise from the period 2000–2009 average (12.5TWh wind power is 8% of total = 12.5/0.08=156TWh)

=== Hydropower ===
A very large amount of the electricity is produced by Hydroelectric power plants. The largest ones are predominantly located on the Lule River in the northern part of the country, but a few large and a lot of medium plants are located in the middle part of the country. Throughout the whole country are also more than 1100 smaller plants. Today there's about 46 plants with a capacity of 100 MW and over, 18 with 200 MW and over, and 6 with 400 MW and over. The largest one is very close to 1000 MW. No new plants other than ones owned by private people are planned, mainly because the unharnessed rivers are protected by law and the regulated ones do not have more rapids to regulate. Most plants were built between 1940–1980.

Name	River	Capacity (Megawatts)
Harsprånget	Lule River	977
Stornorrfors	Ume River	~600
Porjus	Lule River	480
Messaure	Lule River	460
Letsi	Lesser Lule River	440
Kilforsen	Fjällsjö river	~415
Trängslet Dam	Dal River	330
Vietas	Lule River	325
Ligga	Lule River	324
Ritsem	Lule River	320
Porsi	Lule River	280
Krångede	Indal River	248
Olidan	Göta River	235
Storfinnforsen	Fax River	227
Seitevare	Lesser Lule River	225

=== Biofuels ===
In 2008 the supply of biofuel in electricity production was 12.3 TWh in 2008 and 13.3 TWh in 2009. The volume of biofuels has increased since 1998 (4 TWh in 1998).

=== Fossil fuels ===
In 2008 the fossil fuel supplies for electricity production were: oil 1 TWh, natural gas 1 TWh and coal 3 TWh.

=== Peat ===
The IEA and EU classify peat as fossil fuel. The IEA tables combine peat energy and coal energy. Peat is not classified as a renewable fuel in Directive 2001/77/EC on the Promotion of Electricity Produced from Renewable Energy Sources in the Internal Electricity Market. The Swedish energy data reported e.g. in 2008 often combine peat with biofuels instead of hard coal. This is in contradiction with the international statistical standards.

Electricity production from peat in 2007 amounted to about 0.7 TWh. Peat imports amounted to 379 000 tonnes in 2007 equivalent to 0.9–1.1 TWh. but was used also in the district heating plants 2.8 TWh annually in 2007–2009. From 1 January 2008 (valid in the year 2009) the tax of peat was 1.8 öre/kWh compared to the tax of hard coal 39.5 öre/kWh. Standard emissions are (g CO _{2} / kWh): hard coal 341 and peat 381.

According to the Swedish statistics review the peat harvesting destructs the vegetation including all original plants and animal life. The peat ditching increases the suspended materials in the drainage water. In the peat combustion there is a risk of sulphur and nitrogen oxide emissions. Radioactive substances exist naturally in the peat and are released during combustion and are found in the heavy metals in the ashes.

== By sector ==
In 2009 electricity use was by sector:

- residential, services etc. 72.9 TWh
- industry 48.8 TWh
- district heating, refineries 3.6 TWh.
- transport 2.9 TWh.

=== Transport sector ===
The transport sector used in 2009 petrol 41.7 TWh, diesel 40.6 TWh, renewable fuels 4.6 TWh and electricity 2.9 TWh. The use of electricity in the Swedish transport sector is practically unchanged since 1980 (2.3 TWh). The total final energy use in the transport sector including aviation, international transports and renewable fuels has increased from 1990 to 2009 39% (91.4 TWh / 126.8 TWh) and from 2000 to 2009 21% (104.4 TWh / 126.8 TWh).

== Companies ==
Nord Pool Spot is the power market for Sweden, Norway, Denmark, Finland, Estonia, Latvia and Lithuania. The electric producers in Sweden include: Vattenfall, Fortum, E.On and Sydkraft.

Vattenfall is a 100% state owned company. It produces electricity in several European countries. Vattenfall is 5th top electricity producer in Europe.

In Central Sweden, there is also a single-phase AC power grid operated with 16.7 Hz frequency for power supply of electric railways, see Electric power supply system of railways in Sweden.

== Transmission, import and export ==
Sweden is subdivided into four price areas: Malmö (SE4), Stockholm (SE3), Sundsvall (SE2) and Luleå (SE1) (as of winter 2015).

External image
- Grid map of Scandinavia, 2020

Svenska kraftnät is the national electricity transmission grid operator.

Sweden installed the first 400 kV line in the world in 1952, between Storfinnforsen and Midskog.

Sweden was one big grid price area until November 2011, when it was divided into four different bidding areas. Most of the consumption is in the South (SE3 & SE4) while the production takes place in the North (SE1 & SE2), mainly generated by hydro plants. There is power transmission through HVDC to Poland via the SwePol-link, to Lithuania using the NordBalt-link, to Germany via the Baltic Cable, the Fenno–Skan to Finland and a connection to Denmark by the Konti-Skan-line. There are also conventional AC connections to Denmark, Norway and Finland.

The annual electricity import and export was 10–20 TWh in 2006–2009. Sweden imported 8–10 TWh hydro power from Norway in 2006–2009 and exported some electricity back. Electricity export and import was (TWh) – in 2009 import: Norway 8, Denmark 3, Finland 3 – in 2009 export: Norway 3, Denmark 4, Finland 2, Germany 1, Poland 1 – in 2008 import: Norway 9, Denmark 2, Finland 4 – in 2008 export: Norway 2, Denmark 7, Finland 4, Germany 3, Poland 2

== See also ==
- Ministry of Enterprise, Energy and Communications (Sweden)
- Energy in Sweden

Regional:

- Nordic energy market
