= HVDC Russia–Finland =

Submarine power cable project between Kernovo, Russia and Mussalo, Finland

Location
- Country: Russia; Finland
- From: Kernovo, Lomonosovsky District, Leningrad Oblast (Russia)
- Passes through: Gulf of Finland
- To: Mussalo, Kotka (Finland)

Ownership information
- Owner: United Power Oy
- Partners: Rosenergoatom

Construction information
- Expected: project cancelled

Technical information
- Type: submarine cable
- Current type: HVDC
- Capacity: 1,000 MW
- No. of poles: 2

The HVDC Russia–Finland (also: Kernovo-Mussalo cable) was a proposed HVDC submarine power cable between Kernovo, Leningrad Oblast (Russia) and Mussalo, Kotka (Finland). The project's main purpose was to export Russian nuclear energy to Sweden and Finland.

== History ==
The cable was initially suggested in the 1990s by the Russian State Nuclear Power Company Rosenergoatom. In 2004, United Power Oy, a Finland-based company controlled by Baltenergo, a subsidiary of Rosenergoatom, submitted an official application for the submarine cable and a converter station. On 21 December 2005, United Power and BasEl, representing 16 Swedish and Finnish companies, signed a preliminary 15-year electricity supply agreement.

In December 2006, the Finnish Government rejected the project. In May 2007, United Power announced it would abandon its efforts to build an undersea electric cable from Russia to Finland and would instead pursue a direct link from Russia to Sweden across the Baltic Sea.

After several years, the project was abandoned for political reasons. Politicians dropped support for this project in exchange for resolving other bilateral issues, such as Nord Stream 1, Russian export duties on timber, and the leasing of the Saimaa Canal.

In January 2008, United Power filed for insolvency at the Kotka district court.

== Technical features ==
The submarine cable was planned to have a capacity of 1,000 MW for the transmission of up to 8.7 TWh of electricity per year. It was to consist of two ironclad cables separated by a distance of 50 to 100 metres (160 to 330 ft), and one ground metal cable. It was to be linked with the Leningrad Nuclear Power Plant at Sosnovy Bor.

The project's overall cost was estimated at €300 million. A financing agreement was signed with Russia's state-run foreign economic bank Vnesheconombank (VEB) in June 2006. The project's payback period was estimated at six to nine years, with construction planned for completion in 2009–2010.

== Route ==
The primary proposed route was from Kernovo in Russia to Mussalo in Finland. Alternative options were also considered, including replacing the 1000 MW cable with two 500 MW cables connecting Kernovo with different destinations in Finland. Other considered destinations in Finland were Loviisa, Sipoo, Espoo and Ingå.

After rejection by the Finnish authorities, United Power prepared a new application for a cable with a lower capacity of up to 450 MW and considered an alternative route from Vyborg in Russia to Lappeenranta in Finland. United Power and Baltenergo also explored alternative projects to export Russian electricity to Finland through Estonia, or directly from Russia to Sweden. In February 2007, Baltenergo suggested an undersea power cable from Sosnovy Bor to Estonia instead of Finland, to sell electricity to the Nordic market through Estonia. In January 2007, United Power proposed a submarine cable directly from Russia to Sweden. Baltenergo repeated this proposal in May 2007. However, none of these proposals moved forward.

== United Power ==
United Power Oy was a Finnish-Russian energy company established in 2003 as a special-purpose company for transferring electricity from Russia to Finland and other European countries. The shareholders of United Power were Baltenergo, Kotkan Energia, and a consortium of private investors. András Szép was the Chairman of the Board, and Jaakko Ihamuotila and Pertti Salolainen were Finnish members of the board.

After the Finnish Ministry of Trade and Industry rejected the construction permit, United Power suspended its activities. In January 2008, United Power filed for insolvency at the Kotka district court.

== Controversy ==
The Russian Government backed the project, and Finnish and Swedish industries supported it. However, the Finnish national transmission grid operator Fingrid and some Russian energy companies criticized it. The Russian Federal Grid Company stated that there would not be enough electricity for export in the coming years because the Saint Petersburg area (Leningrad Oblast) was experiencing undercapacity, and the sea cable would worsen the situation by sending electricity abroad instead of to Russian regions. Anatoly Chubais, the CEO of RAO UES, called the project unrealistic and possibly unprofitable. Finnish concerns related to the Finnish grid's ability to adapt to Russian power transmission and the amount of necessary investments into the transmission grid. Fingrid stated that the regional grid in southeastern Finland was operating at maximum capacity and could not handle the additional power. According to Mauri Pekkarinen, the Finnish Minister of Trade and Industry, the undersea cable project would have required €1.5 billion in investments to strengthen the carrying capacity of the Finnish electricity grid.

Some Nordic NGOs expressed concern that the power generated in Sosnovy Bor was unsuitable due to the nuclear power plant's age and potential environmental threat.

United Power argued that the sea cable would increase competition in the Finnish energy market and decrease electricity prices by 6-8%. It also offered to build two gas-fired thermal power plants near Sosnovy Bor with a total capacity of 900 MW as reserve capacity, and to consider alternative routes to reduce the need to upgrade the Finnish transmission system.

== See also ==
- Energy in Finland
- Energy in Russia
