= Ritsem =

Village in the Gällivare Municipality, Sweden

Coordinates: 67°43′N 17°27′E

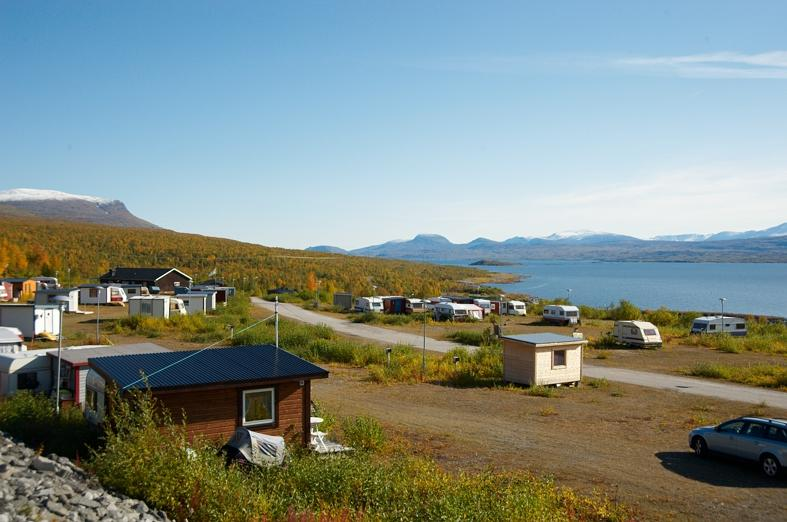
Laponia World Heritage Site in Ritsem

Ritsem is a village in the Gällivare Municipality, Norrbotten County, Sweden. It is located in the Stora Sjöfallet National Park. The area falls within the Swedish Lapland, and is home to the Sámi people during the reindeer migration. The town contains a 320 megawatt hydroelectric power plant, which sits inside a 16 km artificial tunnel connecting lake Sitasjaure to the Akkajaure reservoir. There is also a mountain cabin and caravan camp run by the Swedish Tourist Association.

== Climate ==
Ritsem has a subarctic climate that is significantly moderated by the North Atlantic Current. As a result, summers are typically temperate, and winters relatively cold. Given its northern latitude, it sees a lengthy period of midnight sun during the summer, and a shorter period of polar night with significant twilight in winter. Due to the low sun, summers can see frost well within the midnight sun period. Ritsem's all-time low temperature record for June is lower than any other of the 100 stations featured in the Swedish Meteorological and Hydrological Institute's monthly reports before 1981. By the time Atlantic low-pressure systems take effect in late autumn, temperatures are far milder compared to further east, and even some areas further south. Days above freezing are common throughout November. Winters rarely see temperatures below −30 °C (−22 °F).

Climate data for Ritsem (temperature 2002–2018; precipitation 1961–1990; extremes since 1981)
Month	Jan	Feb	Mar	Apr	May	Jun	Jul	Aug	Sep	Oct	Nov	Dec	Year
Record high °C (°F)	5.8 (42.4)	5.5 (41.9)	7.6 (45.7)	12.4 (54.3)	24.6 (76.3)	26.6 (79.9)	28.2 (82.8)	26.0 (78.8)	19.2 (66.6)	14.7 (58.5)	9.7 (49.5)	6.5 (43.7)	28.2 (82.8)
Mean maximum °C (°F)	2.7 (36.9)	2.8 (37.0)	3.5 (38.3)	7.9 (46.2)	16.2 (61.2)	20.5 (68.9)	23.4 (74.1)	22.3 (72.1)	16.5 (61.7)	9.8 (49.6)	5.7 (42.3)	3.9 (39.0)	24.5 (76.1)
Mean daily maximum °C (°F)	−6.4 (20.5)	−5.7 (21.7)	−3.5 (25.7)	1.7 (35.1)	7.1 (44.8)	12.2 (54.0)	16.9 (62.4)	14.8 (58.6)	9.6 (49.3)	3.3 (37.9)	−0.8 (30.6)	−3.5 (25.7)	3.8 (38.9)
Daily mean °C (°F)	−10.2 (13.6)	−9.3 (15.3)	−7.1 (19.2)	−1.7 (28.9)	3.8 (38.8)	8.5 (47.3)	13.0 (55.4)	11.3 (52.3)	6.7 (44.1)	0.8 (33.4)	−3.6 (25.5)	−6.8 (19.8)	0.5 (32.8)
Mean daily minimum °C (°F)	−14.0 (6.8)	−12.9 (8.8)	−10.7 (12.7)	−5.1 (22.8)	0.5 (32.9)	4.8 (40.6)	9.0 (48.2)	7.7 (45.9)	3.8 (38.8)	−1.7 (28.9)	−6.3 (20.7)	−10.1 (13.8)	−2.9 (26.7)
Mean minimum °C (°F)	−25.3 (−13.5)	−24.5 (−12.1)	−22.3 (−8.1)	−15.1 (4.8)	−5.8 (21.6)	−0.1 (31.8)	4.0 (39.2)	1.9 (35.4)	−1.8 (28.8)	−9.2 (15.4)	−15.1 (4.8)	−20.6 (−5.1)	−27.3 (−17.1)
Record low °C (°F)	−31.5 (−24.7)	−32.0 (−25.6)	−30.8 (−23.4)	−22.3 (−8.1)	−13.0 (8.6)	−4.5 (23.9)	0.8 (33.4)	−0.6 (30.9)	−9.5 (14.9)	−15.2 (4.6)	−27.0 (−16.6)	−29.0 (−20.2)	−32.0 (−25.6)
Average precipitation mm (inches)	38.6 (1.52)	35.5 (1.40)	39.8 (1.57)	23.9 (0.94)	27.4 (1.08)	41.5 (1.63)	65.7 (2.59)	51.6 (2.03)	60.7 (2.39)	41.2 (1.62)	35.5 (1.40)	52.9 (2.08)	514.3 (20.25)
Source 1: SMHI Open Data
Source 2: SMHI climate data 2002–2018
