= List of Swedish counties by GDP =

This is a list of Swedish counties by GDP and GDP per capita.

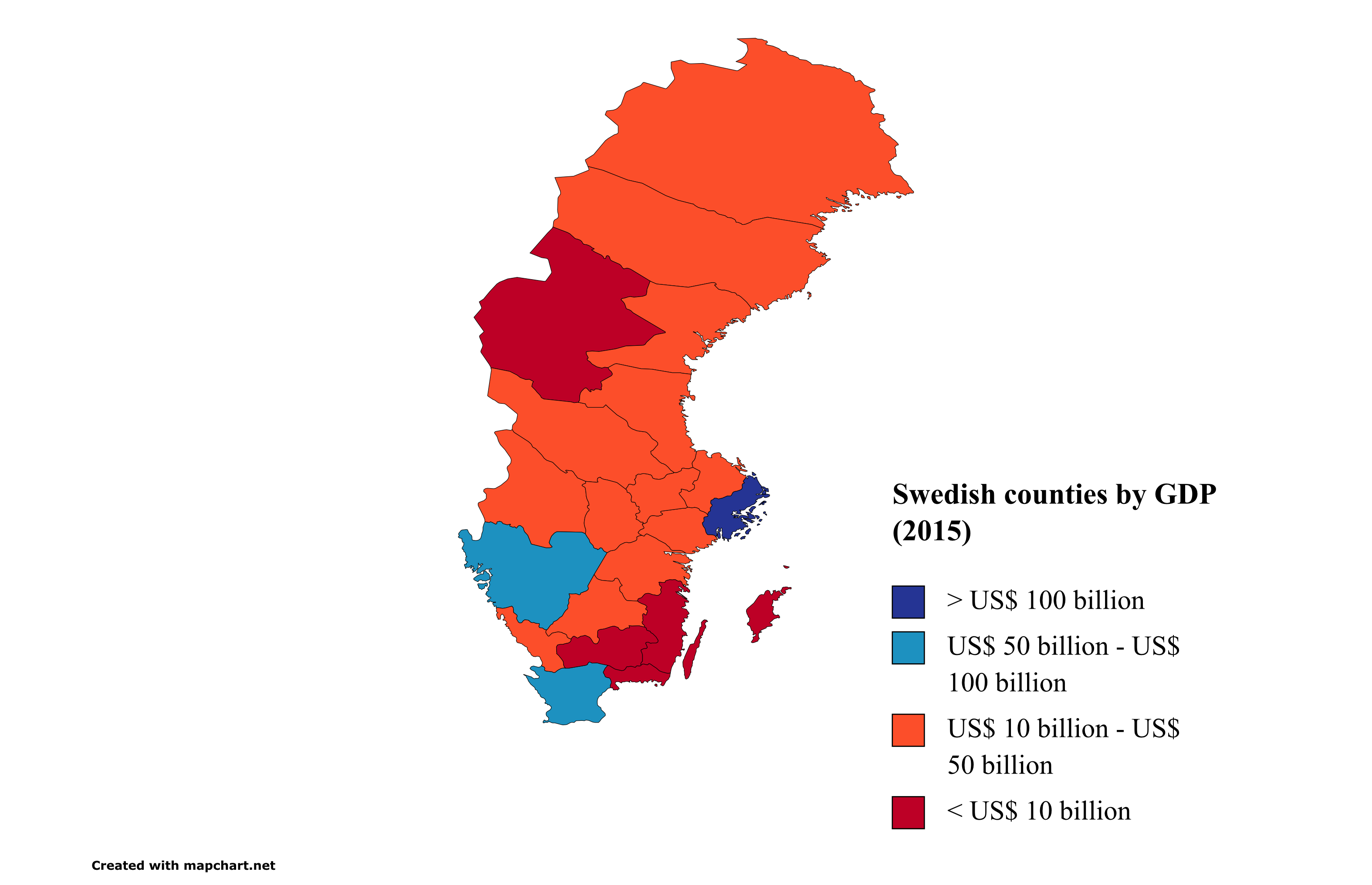
Swedish counties by GDP (2015)

== List of counties by GDP ==
Counties by GDP in 2015 according to data by the OECD.

Rank	County	GDP (mil. SEK)	GDP (mil. Int$ (PPP)
1	Stockholm	1,340,350	149,771
2	Västra Götaland	711,221	79,472
3	Skåne	478,497	53,468
4	Östergötland	166,511	18,606
5	Uppsala	142,126	15,881
6	Jönköping	128,246	14,330
7	Örebro	104,338	11,659
8	Halland	102,150	11,414
9	Norrbotten	101,841	11,380
10	Dalarna	99,110	11,075
11	Västmanland	96,013	10,729
12	Västerbotten	95,948	10,721
13	Gävleborg	94,891	10,603
14	Västernorrland	91,309	10,203
15	Värmland	90,692	10,134
16	Södermanland	86,763	9,695
17	Kalmar	78,364	8,756
18	Kronoberg	75,801	8,470
19	Blekinge	52,847	5,905
20	Jämtland	43,073	4,813
21	Gotland	18,810	2,102
	Sweden	4,199,860	469,296

== List of counties by GDP per capita ==
Counties by GDP per capita in 2021 according to data by Statistics Sweden.

Rank	County	GDP per capita in SEK	GDP per capita in USD (PPP)
1	Stockholm	729,000	83,600
2	Norrbotten	648,000	74,300
3	Västra Götaland	517,000	59,300
4	Kronoberg	508,000	58,300
5	Uppsala	482,000	55,300
6	Västerbotten	473,000	54,200
7	Jönköping	472,000	54,100
8	Västernorrland	468,000	53,700
9	Östergötland	464,000	53,200
10	Örebro	456,000	52,300
11	Skåne	453,000	52,000
12	Blekinge	433,000	49,700
13	Värmland	426,000	48,900
14	Dalarna	425,000	48,700
15	Jämtland	422,000	48,300
16	Västmanland	415,000	47,600
17	Halland	409,000	46,900
18	Gävleborg	408,000	46,800
19	Kalmar	406,000	46,600
20	Gotland	379,000	43,500
21	Södermanland	378,000	43,300
	Sweden	527,000	60,400
