= Copyright law of Sweden =

Seventy years of exclusive rights

The history of copyright in Sweden dates back to the Royal Act Regulating Book Printers of 1752.

Copyright in Sweden today is regulated by the Act on Copyright in Literary and Artistic Works of 1960 (Lag om upphovsrätt till litterära och konstnärliga verk). In 1995 the Act was amended to grant the author or rights-holder exclusive rights to the work for 70 years following the author's death, in line with the EU Copyright Duration Directive.

Court rulings of 2016 and 2017 effectively eliminated freedom of panorama in Sweden.
