= Nordic energy market =

Common electricity market for the Nordic countries

The Nordic electricity market is a common market for electricity in the Nordic countries. It is one of the first free electric-energy markets in Europe and is traded in NASDAQ OMX Commodities Europe and Nord Pool Spot. In 2003, the largest market shares were as follows: Vattenfall 17%, Fortum 14.1%, Statkraft 8.9%, E.on 7.5%, Elsam 5%, Pohjolan Voima 5%. Other producers had 42.5% market share.

== Denmark ==
From 1999 and onwards, Denmark is a net exporter of fossil energy.

=== Wind power in Denmark ===
Wind power provided 18.9% of electricity production and 24.1% of generation capacity in Denmark in 2008, Denmark was a pioneer in developing commercial wind power during the 1970s, and today almost half of the wind turbines around the world are produced by Danish manufacturers such as Vestas and Siemens Wind Power along with many component suppliers.

=== Coal power in Denmark ===
Coal power provided 48.0% of the electricity and 22.0% of the heat in district heating in Denmark in 2008; and in total provided 21.6% of total energy consumption (187PJ out of 864PJ) and is based mainly on coal imported from outside Europe.

== Finland ==
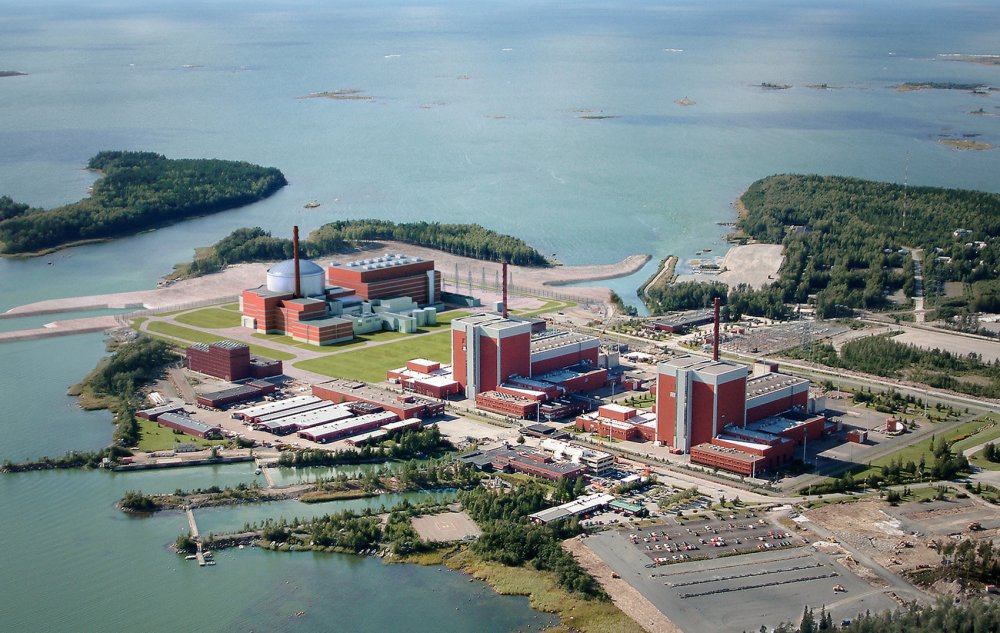
Olkiluoto Nuclear Power Plant with two existing units. The third unit and Finland's fifth (far left) is computer manipulated and was planned to be ready by 2009, but became operational in 2023.

Cheap and reliable energy is of exceptional importance to Finland. The energy demand is high because of its cold climate and the structure of its industry. Finland's hydrocarbon resources are limited to peat and wood, while neighboring Norway has oil and Estonia oil shale. Until the 1960s, Finnish energy policy relied on the electricity produced by hydropower stations and extensive decentralised use of wood for energy. Finland's 187,888 lakes do not lie much above sea level – less than 80 metres in the case of the two biggest lakes, Saimaa and Päijänne. Consequently, Finland has less hydropower capacity than Sweden or Norway.

Finnish energy cooperative Teollisuuden voima operates four nuclear reactors that produce 18 percent of the country's energy. There is also one research reactor at Otaniemi campus. Olkiluoto Nuclear Power Plant unit 3, the fifth AREVA-Siemens-built reactor at 1600 MWe, was originally planned to be finished by 2009; it began regular electricity production in April 2023. Finland's Kyoto and EU emission terms are causing a sharp increase in energy prices and the existing reactors are aging: there has been talk about many more reactors and the sixth is already under environmental impact assessment.

Wind power would be by far the cleanest energy form in Finland (the existing hydropower plants and nuclear power excluded), but because political parties – p—icularly the True Finns – arehesitant to grant wind power permits, most energy is produced from fossil fuels, mainly coal and oil. About 25 percent of energy production is categorized to be renewable energy, which is high compared to the EU average 10 pof ercent. About one fifth of all the energy consumed in Finland is wood-based. Industrial residue and garbage are often utilized for energy. Many homeowners use wood as an additional (but not primary) heat source. About seven percent of electricity is produced from peat harvested from Finland's extensive bogs.

Currently, some electricity is imported to Finland. In recent years, a varying amount (5–17 percent) of power has been imported from Russia, Sweden and Norway. The Norwegian and Swedish hydroelectric plants remain an important source for imported power. The current energy policy debate is centreed on self-sustainability. There are plans to build a submarine power cable from Russia, but this is also considered a national security issue. The government has already rejected one plan for such a power cable. Neste Oil operates two large oil refineries for domestic and Baltic markets, refining products that make up 36 percent of chemical exports.

== Norway ==
Hydropower provides almost 88% of the energy production in Norway. The country lacks big lakes that can be used for water storage. However, there are great height differences due to the country's mountainous nature. This,together with heavy rain and snowfall each year makes for favorable hydropower conditions. Norway has some of the largest hydroelectric power stations in Europe, such as Kvilldal Hydroelectric Power Station at 1240 MW, which is a greater capacity than Sweden's largest, Harsprånget at 977 MW.

Norway exports a significant share of its electricity production via submarine cables, including Skagerrak to Denmark, NorNed to the Netherlands, North Sea Link to the United Kingdom and NordLink to Germany.

Oil and natural gas produced in the country is mostly exported, and the small oil amounts used are mostly for vehicles.

Amid rapid increase in electricity demand driven by industrial growth and digital infrastructure expansion, the Norwegian transmission system operator and regional authorities have moved to tighten grid connection controls. Energy market analysts note that these policy shifts focus heavily on balancing local industrial power allocation and commercial surplus sharing frameworks against constrained regional transmission capacities.

== Sweden ==
Historical electricity production in Sweden by source

The 1973 oil crisis strengthened Sweden's commitment to decrease dependence on imported fossil fuels. Since then, electricity has been generated mostly from hydropower and nuclear power. Among other things, the accident of Three Mile Island Nuclear Generating Station (United States) prompted the Swedish parliament to hold a referendum on nuclear power. The referendum led to a decision that no further nuclear power plants should be built and that a nuclear power phase-out should be completed by 2010. Instead, Sweden has elected to build new reactors to replace its existing ones.

In 2006, out of a total electricity production of 139 TWh, electricity from hydropower accounted for 61 TWh (44%), and nuclear power delivered 65 TWh (47%). At the same time, the use of biofuels, peat etc. produced 13 TWh (9%) of electricity, while wind power produced 1 TWh (1%). Sweden was a net importer of electricity by a margin of 6 TWh. Biomass is mainly used to produce heat for district heating and central heating and industry processes.

In March 2005, an opinion poll showed that 83% supported maintaining or increasing nuclear power. Since then however, reports about radioactive leakages at a nuclear waste store in Forsmark, Sweden, have been publishedthough this does not seem to have changed the public support of continued use of nuclear power. In 2010 Parliament halted the phase-out policy, allowing for new reactors to replace existing ones.

In an effort to phase out the dependency on nuclear power and fossil fuels, the Swedish government has launched a multi-billion krona programme to promote renewable energy and energy efficiency. The country has for many years pursued a strategy of indirect taxation as an instrument of environmental policy, including energy taxes in general and carbon dioxide taxes in particular. Also in 2005, Sweden garnered international attention by announcing its intention to break its dependence on foreign oil within 15 years, with the goal of becoming the world's first oil-free economy.

Internal bottlenecks in the Swedish electric grid (Cut 2 and Cut 4) restrict transmission of electricity between hydro plants in the north, and nuclear and fossil plants in the south. Sweden had a policy of a single system price regardless of power differences between areas up until 2011. This was changed and today Sweden has four different price zones.

== See also ==
- Governance of hydropower in Scandinavia
- Nord Pool
