= Corruption in Sweden =

Corruption in Sweden has been defined as "the abuse of power" by the Swedish National Council for Crime Prevention (Brå). By receiving bribes, bribe takers abuse their position of power, consistent with how the National Anti-Corruption Unit of the Swedish Prosecution Authority specifies the term. Although bribes and improper rewards are central in the definition of corruption in Sweden, corruption in the sense of "abuse of power" can also manifest itself in other crimes such as misuse of office, embezzlement, fraud and breach of trust against a principal.

== Legal definition ==
The provisions on bribery and taking bribes are found in Chapter 10 of the Swedish Penal Code. Bribe giving is the criminal act of giving, promising either offering or receiving, accepting a promise of or demanding an improper reward, for the performance of duties. Anything of direct or indirect value to the recipient can be considered an improper reward. The provisions on taking a bribe and giving a bribe are applicable both within the public and the private sector. They are also applicable to acts of bribery committed abroad or if the persons involved are foreign, provided that the acts of bribery are subject to the jurisdiction of Swedish courts.

== Level of corruption ==
The level of corruption in Sweden is very low, according to a 2011 pan-European study by Transparency International. Transparency International's 2025 Corruption Perceptions Index scored Sweden at 80 on a scale from 0 ("highly corrupt") to 100 ("very clean"). When ranked by score, Sweden ranked 6th among the 182 countries in the Index, where the country ranked first is perceived to have the most honest public sector. Although very high when compared to the rest of the world, Sweden's scores of 80 in the 2024 and 2025 Index were its lowest ever in the twelve years that the current version of the Index has been published. For comparison with regional scores, the best score among Western European and European Union countries (Note: Austria, Belgium, Bulgaria, Croatia, Cyprus, Czechia, Denmark, Estonia, Finland, France, Germany, Greece, Hungary, Iceland, Ireland, Italy, Latvia, Lithuania, Luxembourg, Malta, Netherlands, Norway, Poland, Portugal, Romania, Slovakia, Slovenia, Spain, Sweden, Switzerland, and the United Kingdom.) was 89, the average score was 64 and the worst score was 40. For comparison with worldwide scores, the best score was 89 (ranked 1), the average score was 42, and the worst score was 9 (ranked 181, in a two-way tie). The legal and institutional framework in Sweden are considered effective in fighting against corruption, and the government agencies are characterized by a high degree of transparency, integrity and accountability.

However, the OECD Working Group on Bribery has since 2012 repeatedly urged Sweden to reform its laws to ensure the investigation and prosecution of companies that bribe foreign public officials to obtain advantages in international business. This refers to the requirements of the OECD Convention on Combating Bribery of Foreign Public Officials in International Business Transactions.

There are municipal cases showing signs of irregular public procurement procedures between public and private actors. According to a case study of the Swedish Competition Authority consisting of judgments where corruption has occurred in connection with public procurement the most common corruption situation is such that an official in a municipal administration or municipal company with close contact with suppliers receives a bribe during an ongoing contractual relationship. Of the proportion of convicted corruption convictions, 70 percent concern building and construction. However, the report sees a high number of unrecorded procedures as likely.

The low levels of corruption are attributed to an efficient public administration, high-quality comprehensive services to citizens and enterprises, and a long tradition of openness and transparency of Swedish society and institutions, along with a strong respect for the rule of law, according to an Anti-corruption European Commission report. According to the same report, The Special Eurobarometer on Corruption places Sweden among the countries with the least corruption in the EU. 40% of Swedish respondents believe that corruption is widespread in their country (EU average: 76%) and 12% feel personally affected by corruption in their daily life (EU average: 26%).

The number of cases reported, prosecuted and the number of convictions have been stable over time, according to a 2013 study by Brå. The study found that corruption in Sweden can mostly be described as being simple, in that most cases involve smaller amounts, conference travel, dining and such.

== Cases ==
=== TeliaSonera in Azerbaijan ===
The former Swedish agency Televerket, now a private company TeliaSonera is suspected of involvement in a corruption scandal in Azerbaijan, the Swedish newspaper Svenska Dagbladet reports. Corruption by proxy is the term used in these instances.

=== The Swedish Prison and Probation Service ===
The head of facilities management at The Swedish Prison and Probation Service was sentenced to 3.5 years in prison which in 2016 was the largest corruption case involving a civil servant in Sweden.

== See also ==
- Crime in Sweden
