= List of HVDC projects =

Notable 100+ kV electrical transmission systems

Electric power transmission through interconnectors using high-voltage direct-current (HVDC) involves usually two converter stations and a transmission line. Generally overhead lines are used, but an important class of HVDC projects use submarine power cables. A back-to-back station has no transmission line and joins two separate AC grids at a single point. Historical HVDC systems used the Thury system of motor-generators but these have all been made obsolete by later developments such as mercury-arc valves (now also obsolete), thyristors, and IGBT power transistors.

== Legend ==
Converter technology:

- Thury = Series-connected generators as designed by René Thury
- Merc = Mercury-arc valve rectifier and inverter
- Thyr = Thyristor rectifier and inverter
- IGBT = Insulated gate bipolar transistor
- BIGT = Bi-mode insulated gate transistor
- IEGT = Injection enhanced gate transistor

Line status:

Existing
Planned
Under construction
Decommissioned

== Africa ==
Name	Converter station 1	Converter station 2	Total Length (Cable/Pole) (km)	Nominal Voltage (kV)	Power (MW)	Year	Type	Remarks	Ref
Cahora Bassa	Mozambique - Songo; 15°36′41″S 32°44′59″E	South Africa - Apollo; 25°55′11″S 28°16′34″E	1420 (0/1420)	533	1920	1979	Thyr	First HVDC with Project up to 500kV; Siemens and ABB refurb 2013–2014	
Inga-Shaba	Democratic Republic of the Congo - Kolwezi; 10°39′27″S 25°27′08″E	Democratic Republic of the Congo - Inga; 05°31′27″S 13°36′39″E	1700 (0/1700)	500	560	1982	Thyr	Upgraded in 2014; Supplier: ABB, General Electric	
Caprivi Link	Namibia - Gerus; 20°18′53″S 16°27′9″E	Namibia - Zambezi; 17°30′6″S 24°13′20″E	950 (0/950)	350	300	2010	IGBT	Supplier: ABB	
Ethiopia–Kenya HVDC Interconnector	Ethiopia - Wolayta; 6°54′27″N 37°43′19″E	Kenya - Suswa; 1°03′44″S 36°21′35″E	1045 (0/1045)	500	2000	2022	Thyr	Supplier: Siemens	

== Australia and Oceania ==
Name	Converter station 1	Converter station 2	Total Length (Cable/Pole) (km)	Nominal Voltage (kV)	Power (MW)	Year	Type	Remarks	Ref
HVDC Inter-Island 1	New Zealand - Benmore; 44°33′55″S 170°11′24″E	New Zealand - Haywards; 41°9′1″S 174°58′52″E	611 (40/571)	270	600	1965	Merc	Built as 250 kV 600 MW link Paralleled to operate at 270 kV as positive pole with HVDC Inter-Island 2 in 1992. Partially decommissioned in 2007, fully decommissioned in August 2012. Supplier: ABB	
HVDC Inter-Island 2	New Zealand - Benmore; 44°33′55″S 170°11′24″E	New Zealand - Haywards; 41°9′1″S 174°58′52″E	611 (40/571)	350	700	1992	Thyr	Negative pole, operates in bipole configuration with HVDC Inter-Island 3 (previously HVDC Inter-Island 1); Restricted to 500 MW due to cable rating. Supplier: ABB	
Terranora interconnector (Directlink)	Australia - Mullumbimby; 28°34′15″S 153°27′8″E	Australia - Bungalora; 28°15′20″S 153°28′20″E	59 (59/0)	80	180	2000	IGBT	Land cable Supplier: ABB	
Murraylink	Australia - Red Cliffs; 34°17′31″S 142°14′19″E	Australia - Berri; 34°14′17″S 140°36′01″E	176 (176/0)	150	200	2002	IGBT	Underground XLPE cable Supplier: ABB	
Basslink	Australia - Loy Yang; 38°15′45″S 146°36′29″E	Australia - George Town; 41°6′53″S 146°53′31″E	370 (298/72)	400	500	2006	Thyr	One of the longest HVDC cable in operation Supplier: Siemens	
HVDC Inter-Island 3	New Zealand - Benmore; 44°33′55″S 170°11′24″E	New Zealand - Haywards; 41°9′1″S 174°58′52″E	611 (40/571)	350	735	2013	Thyr	Positive pole, operates in bipole configuration with HVDC Inter-Island 2 Supplier: Siemens	
Australia–ASEAN Power Link	Australia - Darwin	Singapore	4200 undersea 800 overland			2027		aka Sun Cable	
Marinus link	Australia - Burnie	Australia - Latrobe Valley	Approximately 340 (90/250)		750 + 750	late 2020s			

== Asia ==
Name	Converter station 1	Converter station 2	Total Length (Cable/Pole) (km)	Nominal Voltage (kV)	Power (MW)	Year	Type	Remarks	Ref
Hokkaido - Honshu	Japan - Hakodate; 41°55′55″N 140°39′47″E	Japan - Kamikita; 40°48′06″N 141°11′52″E	193 (44/149)	250	300	1979	Thyr	Supplier: ABB, Hitachi, Toshiba	
Zhou Shan	China - Ningbo; 29°55′25″N 121°46′51″E	China - Gao Tongge; 30°02′13″N 122°04′03″E	54 (12/42)	100	50	1982	Thyr		
Gezhouba - Shanghai	China - Gezhouba Dam; 30°43′44″N 111°14′39″E	China - Nan Qiao; 30°57′22″N 121°24′48″E	1046 (0/1046)	500	1200	1989	Thyr	Power line shares pylons of HVDC Hubei - Shanghai in most part of its track Supplier: ABB, Siemens HVDC C&P System Refurbished by NR Electric	
Sileru-Barsoor	India - Sileru; 17°52′01″N 81°39′21″E	India - Barsoor; 19°8′20″N 81°23′47″E	196 (0/196)	200	100	1989	Thyr	Supplier: BHEL	
Ekibastuz–Tambov	Kazakhstan - Ekibastuz; 51°48′57″N 75°18′58″E	Russia - Tambov; 52°46′25″N 41°19′17″E	2414 (0/2414)	750	6000	-	Thyr	Construction sites abandoned around 1990 owing to collapse of Soviet Union, line was never completed	
Rihand-Delhi	India - Rihand; 24°01′13″N 82°47′21″E	India - Dadri; 28°35′36″N 77°36′16″E	814 (0/814)	500	1500	1990	Thyr	Supplier: ABB, BHEL	
Haenam-Cheju	South Korea - Haenam; 34°22′03″N 126°35′34″E	South Korea - Jeju; 33°32′06″N 126°35′44″E	101 (101/0)	180	300	1996	Thyr	Supplier: Alstom	
Leyte - Luzon	Philippines - Ormoc, Leyte; 11°5′19″N 124°38′21″E	Philippines - Naga, Camarines Sur; 13°36′40″N 123°14′19″E	451 (21/430)	350	440	1998	Thyr	Supplier: ABB, Marubeni HVDC C&P System Refurbished by NR Electric	
Chandrapur-Padghe	India - Chandrapur; 20°0′36″N 79°17′06″E	India - Padghe; 19°21′26″N 73°11′18″E	752 (0/752)	500	1500	1999	Thyr	Supplier: ABB	
Kii Channel	Japan - Anan; 33°49′40″N 134°38′14″E	Japan - Kihoku; 34°12′50″N 135°30′07″E	100 (50/50)	250	1400	2000	Thyr	Supplier: Hitachi, Toshiba, Mitsubishi	
Tian-Guang	China - Tianshengqiao; 24°54′56″N 105°05′47″E	China - Beijiao; 23°18′58″N 113°15′05″E	960 (0/960)	500	1800	2001	Thyr	Supplier: Siemens HVDC C&P System Refurbished by NR Electric	
Thailand-Malaysia	Thailand - Khlong Ngae; 6°42′56″N 100°27′8″E	Malaysia - Gurun; 5°48′45″N 100°32′6″E	110 (0/110)	300	300	2001	Thyr	Supplier: Siemens	
Shengsi	China - Shengsi; 30°42′06″N 122°26′22″E	China - Anabasis Sizu; 30°51′56″N 121°50′25″E	66.2 (63.21/2.99)	50	60	2002	Thyr		
Talcher-Kolar	India - Talcher, Odisha; 21°06′01″N 85°03′49″E	India - Kolar, Karnataka; 13°10′39″N 78°7′0″E	1450 (0/1450)	500	2500	2003	Thyr	Supplier: Siemens	
Three Gorges - Changzhou	China - Longquan; 30°47′6″N 111°31′48″E	China - Zhengping; 31°36′42″N 119°59′27″E	890 (0/890)	500	3000	2003	Thyr	From north bank of Three Gorges to Zhengping, 200 km from Shanghai in the East grid Supplier: ABB, Siemens. Sharing of grounding electrode at Chujiahu with HVDC Hubei-Shanghai	
Guizhou - Guangdong I	China - Anshun, Guizhou; 26°16′23″N 105°48′21″E	China - Zhaoqing, Guangdong; 22°54′57″N 112°29′11″E	980 (0/980)	500	3000	2004	Thyr	Supplier: Siemens	
Three Gorges - Guangdong	China - Jingzhou; 30°27′26″N 112°08′18″E	China - Huizhou; 23°16′15″N 114°12′5″E	940 (0/940)	500	3000	2004	Thyr	Supplier: ABB	
Three Gorges - Shanghai	China - Yidu; 30°31′45″N 111°22′35″E	China - Shanghai; 31°14′13″N 121°11′13″E	1060 (0/1060)	500	3000	2006	Thyr	Supplier: ABB	
Guizhou - Guangdong II	China - Xingren; 25°27′56″N 105°15′14″E	China - Shenzhen; 22°45′1″N 113°59′28″E	1200 (0/1200)	500	3000	2007	Thyr	Supplier: Siemens, Sharing of grounding electrode at Linwu with HVDC Yunnan - Guangdong	
Ballia - Bhiwadi	India - Ballia; 26°04′16″N 83°42′48″E	India - Bhiwadi; 28°11′0″N 76°48′58″E	800 (0/800)	500	2500	2010	Thyr	Supplier: Siemens	
Baoji - Deyang	China - Baoji; 34°34′47″N 107°19′49″E	China - Denyang; 31°19′22″N 104°34′51″E	574 (0/574)	500	3000	2010	Thyr		???
Hulunbeir - Liaoning	China - Hulunbeir; 48°31′04″N 119°43′30″E	China - Shenyang; 41°07′25″N 122°46′44″E	920 (0/920)	500	3000	2010	Thyr	Supplier: ABB	
Xiangjiaba-Shanghai	China - Fulong; 28°32′47″N 104°25′04″E	China - Fengxia; 30°55′32″N 121°46′16″E	1980 (0/1980)	800	6400	2010	Thyr	Supplier: ABB	
Yunnan - Guangdong	China - Yunnan province 25°11′24″N 102°11′30″E	China - Zengcheng; 23°15′19″N 113°40′44″E	1418 (0/1418)	800	5000	2010	Thyr	Supplier: Siemens, Sharing of grounding electrode at Linwu with HVDC Guizhou - Guangdong II highlight: worldwide first dc 800kv hvdc application	
Hubei - Shanghai	China - Jingmen; 30°49′21″N 112°07′15″E	China - Fenjing; 30°52′00″N 121°00′58″E	970 (0/970)	500	3000	2011	Thyr	Power line shares pylons of HVDC Gezhouba - Shanghai in most part of its track, sharing of grounding electrode at Chujiahu with HVDC Shanghai-Changzhou	???
Nanhui Wind Farm Integration	China	China	8.4 (8.4/0)	30	18	2011	IGBT	Supplier: C-EPRI Electric Power Engineering Co., Ltd	
Ningdong - Shandong	China - Yinchuan; 38°06′56″N 106°30′55″E	China - Qingdao; 36°18′41″N 119°52′53″E	1335 (0/1335)	660	4000	2011	Thyr	Supplier:Alstom; C-EPRI Electric Power Engineering Co., Ltd	
Qinghai - Tibet	China - Geermu; 36°21′20″N 95°11′05″E	China - Lhasa; 29°52′39″N 91°11′44″E	1038 (0/1038)	400	1500	2011	Thyr	Powerline reaches altitudes up to 5300 m above sea level Supplier: CET, SGCC	
Mundra - Haryana	India - Mundra; 22°49′46″N 69°33′22″E	India - Mohindergarh 28°21′40″N 76°12′56″E	960 (0/960)	500	2500	2012	Thyr	Supplier: Siemens	
Dalian City Infeed	China - Dalian North	China - Dalian South	43 (43/0)	320	1000	2013	IGBT		
Jinping - Sunan	China - Jinping; 27°50′11″N 102°08′30″E	China - Suzhou; 31°03′44″N 120°37′20″E	2090 (0/2090)	800	7200	2013	Thyr	Supplier: ABB, C-EPRI Electric Power Engineering Co., Ltd ACC Provided by NR Electric in Jinping Converter Station	
Nanao Multi-terminal VSC HVDC	China - Sucheng; 23°26′40″N 116°48′50″E	China - Jinniu; 23°26′14″N 117°01′36″E; China - Qingao; 23°25′46″N 117°07′45″E	32 (10/32)	±160	200/100/50	2013	IEGT/IGBT	SEPRI (Electric Power Research Institute, China Southern Power Grid) is technically responsible for the entire project. Multiple suppliers are involved: three different VSC HVDC valve suppliers, two different HVDC land/sea cable suppliers and three different control & protection system/equipment suppliers.	
Nuozhadu - Guangdong	China - Nuozhadu; 22°39′20″N 100°40′00″E	China - Jiangmen; 22°42′33″N 112°52′12″E	1413	800	6400	2013	Thyr		???
Xiluodo - Guangdong	China - Zhaotong; 28°07′21″N 104°22′27″E	China - Conghua; 23°34′00″N 113°27′03″E	1286 (0/1286)	500	6400	2013	Thyr		???
Hami - Zhengzhou	China-Hami; 42°35′20″N 93°27′46″E	China-Zhengzhou; 34°48′46″N 114°03′24″E	2210	800	8000	2014	Thyr	Supplier: C-EPRI Electric Power Engineering Co., Ltd HVDC C&P System Provided by NR Electric	
Jindo - Jeju	South Korea - Jindo; 34°23′08″N 126°11′14″E	South Korea - Jeju; 33°27′17″N 126°28′25″E	105 (105/0)	250	400	2014	Thyr	Supplier: Alstom (converter stations), LS Cable and System (cables).	
Xiluodo - West Zhejiang	China - Xiluodu; 28°27′37″N 104°20′20″E	China - Jinghua; 28°53′46″N 119°43′00″E	1680	800	8000	2014	Thyr	Supplier:C-EPRI Electric Power Engineering Co., Ltd	???
Zhoushan Multi-terminal DC Interconnection	China - Zhoushan; 30°09′07″N 121°59′29″E	China - Qushan; 30°25′26″N 122°16′48″E ; China - Daishan; 30°19′37″N 122°11′35″E ; China - Yangshan; 30°36′26″N 122°07′40″E ; China - Sijiao; 30°41′45″N 122°25′50″E	134 (134/0)	±200	400	2014	IGBT	Supplier:C-EPRI Electric Power Engineering Co., Ltd HVDC C&P System Provided by NR Electric	
Humeng - Shandong	China	China		800	6400	2015	Thyr		???
Irkutsk - Beijing	Russia - Irkutsk	China - Beijing		800	6400	2015	Thyr		???
Champa-Kurukshetra	India - Champa	India - Kurukshetra	1365 (0/1365)	800	2 x 3000	2016	Thyr	2 Bipoles. Supplier: Alstom	
Goupitan - Guangdong	China	China			3000	2016	Thyr		???
Jinsha River II - East China	China	China		800	6400	2016	Thyr		???
North-East Agra	India - Agra; 27°05′01″N 78°04′22″E	India - Biswanath; 26°44′23″N 93°13′09″E	1728 (0/1728)	800	6000	2016	Thyr	Will supply electricity to serve 90 million people Bipole Ultra high voltage, multiterminal (intermediate converter station at Alipurdauar 26°29′23″N 89°27′41″E); Supplier: ABB	
New HVDC Hokkaido-Honshu	Japan - Imabetsu; 41°08′01″N 140°30′46″E	Japan - Hokuto; 41°54′57″N 140°35′07″E	122 (24/98)	250	300	2019	IGBT	suppliers: Toshiba	
Matiari to Lahore Transmission Line Project	Pakistan - Matiari, Sindh	Pakistan - Lahore, Punjab	878	660	4000	2021	Thyr	±660 kV Bipole HVDC with Converter/ Grounding Electrode Stations	
Inner Mongolia - Linyi	China - Shizhustan; 38°46′40″N 106°52′00″E	China - Linyi; 35°33′07″N 118°37′07″E		800	6400	2017	Thyr		???
Jiuquan- Xiangtan	China - Qiaowan; 40°36′03″N 96°43′22″E	China - Xiangtan; 27°38′55″N 112°47′25″E		800	6400	2017	Thyr	Supplier:C-EPRI Electric Power Engineering Co., Ltd HVDC C&P System Provided by NR Electric	???
North Shanxi - Nanjing	China - North Shanxi; 39°39′35″N 112°27′45″E	China - Nanjing; 32°54′47″N 118°35′33″E				2017	Thyr		???
Northwest Yunnan - Guangdong	China - Xinsong; 26°24′55″N 99°49′12″E	China - Dongfang; 22°44′17″N 113°52′07″E	1953	800	5000	2018	Thyr		???
Xilin Hot - Taizhou	China - Xilin Hot; 44°14′40″N 116°30′22″E	China - Taizhou; 33°07′25″N 119°58′05″E		800	10000	2017	Thyr		???
Yinchuan - Zhuji	China - Yinchuan; 37°43′45″N 106°32′22″E	China - Zhuji; 29°56′25″N 120°13′12″E		800	6400	2017	Thyr	HVDC C&P System Provided by NR Electric	???
Dianxibei - Guangdong	China-Lijiang	China-Zhengzhen	1928/0	800	5000	2017	Thyr	Supplier: C-EPRI Electric Power Engineering Co., Ltd	???
Jinsha River II - Fujian	China	China		800	6400	2018	Thyr		???
Humeng - Liaoning	China	China		800	6400	2018	Thyr		???
Rudong Offshore Wind Connector	China - Jiangsu Rudong	China - Jiangsu Rudong Platform	100 (100/0)	400	1100	2022	IGBT	Suppliers: XJ and RXHK for valve, ZTT Cable	
Sheyang Offshore Wind Connector	China - Jiangsu Sheyang	China - Jiangsu Sheyang Platform	83 (83/0)	250	1100	2022	IGBT		
Zhangbei DC Grid Project	China - Beijing	China - Zhangbei; China - Fengning; China - Kangbao	495 (0/495)	500	3000/3000/1500/1500	2021	IGBT	Four terminal DC Grid Suppliers: NR Electric, others	
Wudongde multi-terminal UHVDC demonstration project	China - Yunnan	China - Guangxi; China - Guangdong	1489 (0/1489)	800	8000/3000/5000	2021	Thyr/IGBT	Three terminal Hybrid DC system, Yunnan (Thyristor), Guangdong and Guangxi (IGBT)	
Raigarh-Pugalur	India - Raigarh; 21°51′21″N 83°21′01″E	India - Pugalur; 10°49′33″N 77°32′13″E; India - Thrissur	1830	800	6000	2019	Thyr	Supplier: ABB; One of the World's biggest Multi-terminal HVDC system with Ultra High Voltage DC Transmission system (UHVDC)	
CASA-1000	Tajikistan - Sangtuda	Pakistan - Nowshera	750	500	1300	2025	Thyr	±500 kV Bipole HVDC with Converter Stations	
India–Sri Lanka HVDC Interconnection	Madurai - India	Anurathapura - Sri Lanka	285	±320	500/1000	2030	Thyr		
Andaman HVDC Connection	Paradip - India	Port Blair - India	1160	±320	250/125	2030	IGBT	one of the world's longest deep-sea UG cable HVDC system	

== Europe ==
Name	Converter station 1	Converter station 2	Total Length (Cable/Pole) (km)	Nominal Voltage (kV)	Power (MW)	Year	Type	Remarks	Ref
Miesbach-Munich Power Transmission	Germany - Miesbach	Germany - Munich	58 (0/58)	2	0.0025	1882	Single machine	Demonstration facility Dismantled	
Gorzente River - Genoa DC transmission scheme	Italy - Gorzente River	Italy - Genoa	?	6	?	1889	Thury	Upgraded later to a voltage of 14 kV, power of 2.5 MW and a length of 120 km Dismantled	
La Chaux-de-Fonds DC transmission scheme	Switzerland - ?	Switzerland - ?	?	14	?	1897	Thury	Dismantled	
St. Maurice - Lausanne DC transmission scheme	Switzerland - St. Maurice	Switzerland - Lausanne	?	22	3.7	1899	Thury	Dismantled	
Lyon-Moutiers DC transmission scheme	France - Lyon	France - Moutiers	200 (10/190)	75	30	1906	Thury	Dismantled in 1936	
Wilesden-Ironbridge DC transmission scheme	UK - Wilesden	UK - Ironbridge	?	100	?	1910	Thury	Dismantled	
Chambéry DC transmission scheme	France - ?	France - ?	?	150	?	1925	Thury	Dismantled in 1937	
HVDC Zurich-Wettingen	Switzerland - Wettingen 47°27′25″N 8°19′15″E	Switzerland - Zurich	20 (0/20)	50	0.5	1939	Merc	Experimental facility built by BBC Dismantled	
HVDC Charlottenburg-Moabit	Germany - Berlin-Moabit	Germany - Berlin-Charlottenburg	4.6 (0/4.6)	100	14	1942	Merc	Experimental facility built by Siemens Dismantled in 1945	
Lehrte-Misburg HVDC	Germany - Lehrte 52°22′54″N 9°55′03″E	Germany - Hannover/Misburg	?	80	16	1944	Merc	Experimental facility Dismantled	
Elbe-Project	Germany - Vockerode 51°50′32″N 12°21′26″E	Germany - Berlin, Marienfelde 52°25′39″N 13°22′13″E	115 (115/0)	200	60	1945	Merc	Never placed in service Dismantled	
HVDC Trollhättan-Mellerud	Sweden - Trollhättan	Sweden - Mellerud	50 (0/50)	45	6.5	1946	Merc	Experimental facility built by ASEA Dismantled	
Moscow–Kashira	Russia - Moscow 55°39′32″N 37°38′16″E	Russia - Kashira 54°51′29″N 38°14′45″E	100 (100/0)	200	30	1951	Merc	Built of parts of HVDC Elbe-Project Shut down	
Gotland 1	Sweden - Västervik 57°43′41″N 16°38′51″E	Sweden - Yigne 57°35′13″N 18°11′44″E	98 (98/0)	200	20	1954	Merc	World's first commercial HVDC link, by ASEA. Expanded by ABB in 1970, decommissioned in 1986	
Cross-Channel	France - Echingen 50°41′48″N 1°38′21″E	UK - Lydd 50°54′54″N 0°56′50″E	64 (64/0)	100	160	1961	Merc	Shut down in 1984	
Volgograd-Donbass	Russia - Volzhskaya 48°49′34″N 44°40′20″E	Ukraine - Mikhailovskaya 48°39′13″N 38°33′56″E	475 (0/475)	400	750	1965	Merc/Thyr	Shut down in 2014	
Konti-Skan 1	Denmark - Vester Hassing 57°3′46″N 10°5′24″E	Sweden - Stenkullen 57°48′15″N 12°19′13″E	176 (87/89)	250	250	1965	Merc	Replaced in August 2006 by modern converters using thyristors	
SACOI 1	Italy - Suvereto 43°3′10″N 10°41′42″E ( before 1992: Italy - San Dalmazio 43°15′43″N 10°55′05″E)	France- Lucciana 42°31′40″N 9°26′59″E ; Codrongianos, Italy 40°39′7″N 8°42′48″E	483 (365/118)	200	200	1965	Merc	Replaced in 1986 by Thyr, multiterminal scheme. The line reused by SACOI 2, see below.	
Kingsnorth	UK - Kingsnorth 51°25′11″N 0°35′46″E	UK - London-Beddington 51°22′23″N 0°7′38″W	85 (85/0)	266	320	1975	Merc	Bipolar scheme Supplier: English Electric Shut down in 1987	
Kingsnorth	UK - Kingsnorth	UK - London-Willesden 51°32′03″N 0°15′29″W	111 (111/0)	266	320	1975	Merc	Opposite pole of Kingsnorth - Beddington. Cable wholly underground except for Thames crossing - crossed on upstream side of Putney District line railway bridge	
Skagerrak 1 + 2	Denmark - Tjele 56°28′44″N 9°34′1″E	Norway - Kristiansand 58°15′36″N 7°53′55″E	230 (130/100)	250	500	1977	Thyr	Supplier: STK (Nexans); Control system upgrade by ABB in 2007	
Gotland 2	Sweden - Västervik 57°43′41″N 16°38′51″E	Sweden - Yigne 57°35′13″N 18°11′44″E	99.5 (92.9/6.6)	150	130	1983	Thyr	Supplier: ABB	
Interconnexion France Angleterre (new)	France - Les Mandarins 50°54′11″N 1°47′5″E	UK - Sellindge 51°6′21″N 0°58′32″E	72 (72/0)	270	2000	1986	Thyr	2 bipolar systems Supplier: Alstom	
Gotland 3	Sweden - Västervik 57°43′41″N 16°38′51″E	Sweden - Yigne 57°35′13″N 18°11′44″E	98 (98/0)	150	130	1987	Thyr	Supplier: ABB	
Konti-Skan 2	Denmark - Vester, Hassing 57°3′46″N 10°5′24″E	Sweden - Lindome 57°36′24″N 12°6′40″E	147 (87/60)	285	300	1988	Thyr	Supplier: ABB	
Fenno-Skan	Finland - Rauma 61°09′07″N 21°37′32″E	Sweden - Dannebo 60°24′14″N 18°08′10″E	233 (200/33)	400	500	1989	Thyr	Supplier: ABB	
SACOI 2	Italy - Suvereto 43°3′10″N 10°41′42″E ( before 1992: Italy - San Dalmazio 43°15′43″N 10°55′05″E)	France- Lucciana 42°31′40″N 9°26′59″E ; Codrongianos, Italy 40°39′7″N 8°42′48″E	422 (118/304)	200	300	1992	Thyr	Multiterminal scheme Supplier: Alstom	
Skagerrak 3	Denmark - Tjele 56°28′44″N 9°34′1″E	Norway - Kristiansand 58°15′36″N 7°53′55″E	230 (130/100)	350	440	1993	Thyr	Supplier: Nexans ABB	
Baltic Cable	Germany - Lübeck- Herrenwyk 53°53′46″N 10°48′9″E	Sweden - Kruseberg 55°30′1″N 13°8′45″E	262 (250/12)	450	600	1994	Thyr	Supplier: ABB	
Kontek	Denmark - Bjæverskov 55°27′1″N 12°0′27″E	Germany - Bentwisch 54°6′3″N 12°13′1″E	170 (170/0)	400	600	1996	Thyr	Supplier: ABB	
Hellsjön-Grängesberg	Sweden - Hellsjön 60°02′50″N 15°08′52″E	Sweden - Grängesberg 60°03′53″N 14°59′39″E	10 (0/10)	180	3	1997	IGBT	Experimental HVDC Supplier: ABB	
Visby-Näs	Sweden - Näs 57°05′58″N 18°14′27″E	Sweden - Visby 57°37′29″N 18°21′18″E	70 (70/0)	80	50	1999	IGBT	World's first commercial HVDC Light	
SwePol	Poland - Wierzbięcin 54°30′8″N 16°53′28″E	Sweden - Stärnö 56°9′11″N 14°50′29″E	245 (245/0)	450	600	2000	Thyr	Supplier: ABB	
Tjæreborg	Denmark - Tjæreborg/Enge 55°26′52″N 8°35′34″E	Denmark - Tjæreborg/Substation 55°28′07″N 8°33′36″E	4.3 (4.3/0)	9	7	2000	IGBT	Interconnection to wind power generating stations	
Italy-Greece	Greece - Arachthos 39°11′00″N 20°57′48″E	Italy - Galatina 40°9′53″N 18°7′49″E	310 (200/110)	400	500	2001	Thyr		
Moyle	UK - Auchencrosh 55°04′10″N 4°58′50″W	UK - N. Ireland- Ballycronan More 54°50′34″N 5°46′11″W	63.5 (63.5/0)	250	500	2001	Thyr	Supplier: Siemens, Nexans	
HVDC Troll	Norway - Kollsnes 60°33′01″N 4°50′26″E	Norway - Offshore platform Troll A 60°40′00″N 3°40′00″E	70 (70/0)	60	80	2004	IGBT	Power supply for offshore gas compressor Supplier: ABB	
Estlink	Finland - Espoo 60°12′14″N 24°33′06″E	Estonia - Harku 59°23′5″N 24°33′37″E	105 (105/0)	150	350	2006	IGBT	Supplier: ABB	
NorNed	Netherlands - Eemshaven 53°26′4″N 6°51′57″E	Norway - Feda 58°16′58″N 6°51′55″E	580 (580/0)	450	700	2008	Thyr	Supplier: ABB, Nexans	
BritNed	UK - Grain 51°26′24″N 0°43′0″E	Netherlands - Maasvlakte 51°57′27″N 4°01′17″E	245 (245/0)	450	1000	2010	Thyr	Operational since April 2011. Supplier: Siemens	
StoreBælt	Denmark - Fraugde 55°22′01″N 10°30′25″E	Denmark - Herslev 55°31′53″N 11°19′01″E	56 (56/0)	400	600	2010	Thyr	Operational since August 2010. Supplier: Siemens	
Cometa	Spain - Morvedre 39°38′28″N 0°14′7″W	Spain - Santa Ponsa 39°32′2″N 2°30′21″E	247 (247/0)	250	400	2011	Thyr	Expected completion 2011 Supplier: Siemens (converter stations); Prysmian/Nexans (cables)	
Fenno-Skan 2	Finland - Rauma 61°09′07″N 21°37′32″E	Sweden - Finnböle 60°25′30″N 17°3′42″E	303 (200/103)	500	800	2011	Thyr		
SAPEI	Italy - Latina 41°25′47″N 12°48′25″E	Italy - Fiume Santo 40°50′29″N 8°18′21″E	435 (435/0)	500	1000	2011	Thyr	The largest HVDC link in the Mediterranean Sea. Supplier: ABB	
Valhall HVDC	Norway - Lista 58°04′37″N 6°46′29″E	Norway - Valhall, Offshore platform	292 (292/0)	150	78	2011	IGBT	Supplier: ABB, Nexans	
BorWin1	Germany - Diele	Germany - BorWin Alpha platform	200 (200/0)	±150	400	2012	IGBT	Supplier: ABB	
East West Interconnector	Ireland - Woodland 53°28′16″N 6°34′3″W	UK - Shotton, Wales 53°13′38″N 3°4′22″W	130 (130/0)	±200	500	2012	IGBT	Supplier: ABB	
Fenno-Skan 1 Upgrade	Finland - Rauma	Sweden - Finnböle	233 (200/33)	400	500	2013	Thyr	Upgrade Supplier:ABB	
Estlink 2	Finland - Anttila 60°22′36″N 25°22′01″E	Estonia - Püssi 59°22′13″N 27°04′05″E	171 (157/14)	450	650	2014	Thyr	Supplier: Siemens, Nexans	
ÅL-link	Finland - Naantali (sv:Nådendal) 60°27′49″N 22°03′49″E	Åland - Ytterby	158 (158/0)	80	100	2015	IGBT	Supplier: ABB	
BorWin2	Germany - Diele 53°7′30″N 7°18′29″E	Germany - BorWin Beta platform 54°21′18″N 6°01′30″E	200 (200/0)	±300	800	2015	IGBT	Supplier: Siemens	
DolWin1	Germany - Heede 52°58′57″N 7°15′26″E	Germany - DolWin Alpha platform 53°59′42″N 6°25′16″E	165 (165/0)	±320	800	2015	IGBT	Supplier:ABB	
HelWin1	Germany - Büttel 53°55′01″N 9°13′55″E	Germany - HelWin Alpha platform 54°27′07″N 7°44′20″E	130 (130/0)	±250	576	2015	IGBT	Supplier: Siemens	
HelWin2	Germany - Büttel 53°55′01″N 9°13′55″E	Germany - HelWin Beta platform 54°27′11″N 7°44′20″E	130 (130/0)	±320	690	2015	IGBT	Supplier: Siemens	
INELFE	France - Baixas 42°43′56″N 2°48′14″E	Spain - Santa Llogaia 42°13′59″N 2°56′39″E	64 (64/0)	±320	2000	2015	IGBT	Supplier: Siemens, Cables: Prysmian. €700m, 8 km tunnel near HSR	
LitPol Link HVDC was B2B	Lithuania - Alytus	Poland - Elk	160 (0/160)	70	500	2015^{2}	Thyr	Switched to AC in 2025 to facilitate the Baltic countries' synchronization with CESA. Supplier: ABB	
NordBalt	Sweden - Nybro 56°46′4″N 15°51′15″E	Lithuania - Klaipėda 55°40′54″N 21°15′24″E	450 (450/0)	300	700	2015	IGBT	Supplier: ABB	
Skagerrak 4	Denmark - Tjele 56°28′44″N 9°34′1″E	Norway - Kristiansand 58°15′36″N 7°53′55″E	244 (244/0)	500	700	2015	IGBT	Suppliers: Nexans, ABB	
SylWin1	Germany - Büttel 53°55′01″N 9°13′55″E	Germany - SylWin Alpha platform 55°03′47″N 7°14′28″E	205 (205/0)	±320	864	2015	IGBT	Supplier: Siemens	
Troll A 3&4	Norway - Kollsnes	Norway - Troll A 3&4 platform	70 (70/0)	66	100	2015	IGBT	Supplier: ABB	
DolWin2	Germany - Heede 52°58′52″N 7°15′26″E	Germany - DolWin Beta platform 53°58′41″N 6°55′23″E	135 (135/0)	±320	900	2016	IGBT	Supplier: ABB	
DolWin3	Germany - Heede 52°58′57″N 7°15′26″E	Germany - DolWin Gamma platform 53°59′42″N 6°25′16″E	160 (160/0)	±320	900	2017	IGBT	Supplier: Alstom	
HVDC MON.ITA Project	Italy-Cepagatti 42°23′41″N 14°07′30″E	Montenegro - Lastva Grbaljska 42°19′03″N 18°47′41″E	415 (415/0)	±500	1000	2019	Thyr	Supplier: Toshiba (converter stations); Nexans (cables).	
Western HVDC Link	UK - Hunterston 55°43′16″N 4°53′7″W	UK - Flintshire Bridge 53°13′54″N 3°1′58″W	422 (422/0)	600	2200	2017-18	Thyr	Supplier: Prysmian Group, Siemens; First subsea 600kV link	
Caithness - Moray Link^{3}	UK - Spittal 58°28′47″N 3°27′08″W	UK - Blackhillock 57°31′24″N 2°56′55″W	160	320	1200	2018	IGBT	Supplier: ABB	
BorWin3	Germany - Diele	Germany - BorWin Gamma platform	200 (200/0)	±320	900	2019	IGBT	Supplier: Siemens	
COBRAcable	Denmark - Endrup via Fanø 55°31′49″N 8°42′13″E	Netherlands - Eemshaven 53°26′07″N 6°52′02″E	325	±320	700	2019^{4}	IGBT	Suppliers: Siemens, Prysmian, Cost € 449m	
Johan Sverdrup Phase 1	Norway - Haugsneset	Norway - Johan Sverdrup platform	200 (200/0)	±80	100	2019	IGBT	Supplier: ABB, NKT	
France-Italy via Fréjus Road Tunnel	France, Grand-Île	Italy, Piossasco	190	±320	2x600	2019	IGBT	Supplier: Alstom (converter stations); Prysmian (cables).	
Nemo Link	Belgium - near Bruges	UK - Richborough Energy Park	140 (140/0)	400	1000	2019	IGBT	Converter stations: Siemens, cables: J-power systems	
ALEGrO	Belgium - Visé	Germany - Oberzier	100 (100/0)	320	1000	2020^{5}	IGBT	Converter stations: Siemens Cables: General Cable	
SydVästlänken	Sweden - Barkeryd 57°44′52″N 14°39′19″E	Sweden - Hurva 55°49′59″N 13°36′08″E	260 (197/63)	±300	2x720	2021	IGBT	Supplier: Alstom	
IFA-2	France - Tourbe, Normandie	UK - Chilling, Hampshire	204	320	1000	2021	IGBT	Supplier: ABB	
NORD.LINK	Norway - Tonstad 58°40′07″N 6°45′16″E	Germany - Wilster 53°55′18″N 9°20′41″E	623 (570/53)	525	1400	2021	IGBT	Supplier: ABB	
North Sea Link	Norway - Kvilldal	UK - Blyth	730 (730/0)	515	1400	2021	IGBT	Supplier: ABB, Prysmian Group, Nexans, MACH 3 Control & Protection	
ElecLink	France - Les Mandarins	UK - Sellindge	70	320	1000	2022	IGBT	In the Channel Tunnel; Cost €580m	
Johan Sverdrup Phase 2	Norway - Haugsneset	Norway - Johan Sverdrup platform	200 (200/0)	±80	200	2022	IGBT	Supplier: Siemens, NKT	
Viking Link	Denmark - Revsing	UK - Bicker Fen	740	525	1400	2023	IGBT	Suppliers: Siemens, Prysmian and NKT	
DolWin6	Germany - Emden/Ost	Germany - DolWin Zeta platform	90 (90/0)	±320	900	2023	IGBT	Supplier: Siemens, Prysmian	
Dogger Bank A	UK - Creyke Beck 53°48′33″N 0°25′1″W	UK - Dogger Bank A platform	207 (207/0)	320	1200	2023	IGBT/BIGT	Suppliers: ABB, Aibel and NKT, 172 km submarine cable and 35 km underground cable	
Shetland HVDC Connection	UK - Upper Kergord 60°17′35″N 1°16′15″W	UK - near Staxigoe 58°27′50″N 3°4′52″W	260 (260/0)	320	600	2024^{6}	IGBT		
DolWin5	Germany - Emden/Ost	Germany - DolWin Epsilon platform	130 (130/0)	±320	900	2024	IGBT/BIGT	Supplier: ABB, Aibel, Prysmian	
Ariadne Interconnection	Greece – Athens	Greece – Heraklion	335 (335/0)	500	1000	2024	2025		
Dogger Bank B	UK - Creyke Beck 53°48′33″N 0°25′1″W	UK - Dogger Bank B platform	207 (207/0)	320	1200	2024	IGBT/BIGT	Suppliers: ABB, Aibel and NKT, 172 km submarine cable and 35 km underground cable	
Greenlink	Ireland – County Wexford	UK – Pembrokeshire, Wales	200	320	500	2025			
BorWin5	Germany - Garrel/Ost	Germany - BorWin Epsilon platform	230	320	900	2025			
Dogger Bank C	UK - Lazenby	UK - Dogger Bank C platform	270	320	1200	2026	IGBT/BIGT		
Sofia	UK - Lazenby	UK - Sofia platform	227	320	1320	2026			
Celtic Interconnector	Ireland	France	575	500	700	2028			
East Anglia THREE	UK - Bramford	UK - East Anglia THREE platform	190	320	1400	2026			
SüdOstLink	Germany – Wolmirstedt	Germany – Landshut	500	525	2000	2027			
Hornsea 3 Link 1	UK - Norwich	UK - Hornsea 3 Link 1 platform	170	320		2027			
Hornsea 3 Link 2	UK - Norwich	UK - Hornsea 3 Link 2 platform	170	320		2027			
EuroAsia Interconnector	Israel - Hadera, via Cyprus - Kofinou	Greece - Korakia, Crete	1208	500	2000	2027		Uncertain status, border disputes	
EuroAfrica Interconnector	Egypt - Damietta - via Cyprus - Kofinou	Greece - Korakia, Crete	1396	500	2000	2027			
NeuConnect	Germany - Wilhelmshaven	UK - Isle of Grain	725	±525	1400	2028			
Harmony Link	Lithuania - Darbėnai	Poland - Zarnowiec	330	±320	700	2028			
DolWin4	Germany - Hanekenfähr	Germany - DolWin4 platform	215	320	900	2028			
BorWin4	Germany - Hanekenfähr	Germany - BorWin4 platform	280	320	900	2029			
IJmuiden Ver Alpha	Netherlands - Borssele	Netherlands - IJmuiden Ver Alpha platform	176	525	2000	2029			
IJmuiden Ver Beta	Netherlands - Maasvlakte	Netherlands - IJmuiden Ver Beta platform		525	2000	2029			
IJmuiden Ver Gamma	Netherlands - Maasvlakte	Netherlands - IJmuiden Ver Gamma platform		525	2000	2029			
Eastern Green Link EGL1	UK - Torness nuclear power station	UK - Hawthorn Pit	196	400	2000	2029			
Eastern Green Link EGL2	UK - Peterhead	UK - Drax, North Yorkshire	505	400	2000	2029			
Western Isles HVDC connection	UK - Arnish Point near Stornoway	UK - Beauly	156	320	600	2030			
FAB Link	France - Menuel on Cherbourg Peninsula	UK - Exeter via Alderney	210 (210/0)	320	1400	2030	IGBT		
Nederwiek 1	Netherlands - Borssele	Netherlands - Nederwiek 1 platform	217	525	2000	2030			
Nederwiek 2	Netherlands - Maasvlakte	Netherlands - Nederwiek 2 platform		525	2000	2030			
BalWin1	Germany - Wehrendorf	Germany - BalWin1 platform	360	525	2000	2030			
BalWin2	Germany - Westerkappeln	Germany - BalWin2 platform	380	525	2000	2031			
SuedLink DC3	Germany - Brunsbuettel, 53.896501°N 9.1943543°E	Germany - Grossgartach, 49.143397°N 9.1495596°E	700	±525	2000	2028	IGBT	Suppliers: VSC substations: Siemens Energy, DC cable: nkt Common project of Tennet TSO and Transnet BW highlight: first 525kV fully underground DC cable project	
SuedLink DC4	Germany - Wilster, 53.920632°N 9.340798°E	Germany - Bergrheinfeld, 49.989555°N 10.1486123°E	550	±525	2000	2028	IGBT	Supplier substations: tbd dc cable: Prysmian Common project of TenneT TSO and Transnet BW highlight: first 525kV fully underground DC cable project	
Tyrrhenian Link	Italy – Battipaglia	Italy – Sardinia	970		1000	2028		Connects mainland Italy to Sicily and Sardinia	
Adriatic Link	Italy – Abruzzo	Italy – Marche	250		1000	2028			
LirlC	Belfast, Northern Ireland	Ayrshire, Scotland	142		700	2032			
Estlink 3	Finland	Estonia			700–1000	2035			
Fenno-Skan 3	Finland	Sweden			800	2038			

^{2} As of 9 December 2015, LitPol Link started trial operations.
^{3} Caithness Moray HVDC serves a number of renewable energy sources in the north of Scotland - see map
^{4} Contracts due to be placed in 2016.
^{5} Elia says construction expected to start in late 2017.
^{6} Date is that quoted to support the Shetland Wind Farm that SSE is a part investor in.
^{7} Decision on project expected in 2017 following consultation - see SSE PD reference.

== North America ==
Name	Converter station 1	Converter station 2	Total Length (Cable/Pole) (km)	Nominal Voltage (kV)	Power (MW)	Year	Type	Remarks	Ref
HVDC Mechanicville–Schenectady	USA - Mechanicville, NY; 42°54′45″N 73°40′49″W	USA - Schenectady, NY	37 (0/37)	12	5	1932	Merc	Experimental, frequency conversion 40 to 60 Hz Dismantled after WW II	
Vancouver Island 1	Canada - Delta, BC; 49°5′31″N 123°2′31″W	Canada - North Cowichan, BC; 48°49′39″N 123°42′55″W	75 (42/33)	260	312	1968 - 2014	Merc	Supplier: ASEA	
Pacific DC Intertie	USA - Celilo, OR; 45°35′39″N 121°6′51″W	USA - Sylmar, CA 34°18′39″N 118°29′21″W, 34°18′42″N 118°28′53″W	1362 (0/1362)	±500	3100	1970	Thyr	Transmission voltage ±400 kV until 1984; Maximum transmission power 1440 MW until 1982; From 1982 to 1984 1600 MW; From 1984 to 1989 2000 MW; Merc replaced by Thyr in 2004; Original supplier: ASEA, General Electric; In 1989 upgraded by ABB; In 2004 upgraded by ABB and Siemens	
Nelson River Bipole 1	Canada - Gillam, Manitoba; 56°21′41″N 94°36′48″W	Canada - Rosser, Manitoba; 49°59′39″N 97°25′39″W	895 (0/895)	463.5	1854	1971	Thyr	Used the largest mercury arc rectifiers ever built Original supplier: English Electric. In 1992/1993, Pole 1 upgraded to Thyr by Alstom. In 2004, Pole 2 upgraded to Thyr by Siemens.	
Vancouver Island 2	Canada - Delta, BC; 49°5′31″N 123°2′31″W	Canada - North Cowichan, BC; 48°49′39″N 123°42′55″W	75 (33/42)	280	370	1977 - 2016	Thyr	Supplier: General Electric	
Square Butte	USA - Center, ND (Young); 47°4′18″N 101°11′45″W	USA - Adolph, MN (Arrowhead); 46°46′25″N 92°17′39″W	749 (0/749)	250	500	1977	Thyr	Supplier: General Electric In 2004 Control system upgrade by ABB	
Nelson River Bipole 2	Canada - Sundance, Manitoba; 56°30′14″N 94°8′24″W	Canada - Rosser, Manitoba; 49°59′39″N 97°25′49″W	940 (0/940)	500	2000	1978-1985	Thyr	Supplier: Siemens	
CU	USA - Underwood, ND (Coal Creek); 47°22′24″N 101°9′23″W	USA - Rockford, MN (Dickinson); 45°6′40″N 93°48′36″W	687 (0/687)	400	1000	1979	Thyr	Supplier: ABB In 2004, control system upgrade by ABB	
Path 27	USA - Intermountain, UT; 39°30′2″N 112°34′51″W	USA - Adelanto, CA; 34°33′4″N 117°26′14″W	785 (0/785)	±500	2400	1986	Thyr	Supplier: Asea	
Quebec - New England Transmission	Canada - Radisson, Quebec; 53°43′33″N 77°44′17″W	Canada - Nicolet, QC; 46°04′47″N 72°14′58″W; USA - Ayer, MA; 42°34′13″N 71°31′27″W	1105 (5/1100)	450	2250	1991	Thyr	3 terminals Converter stations near Windsor, Quebec and Monroe, New Hampshire were decommissioned in 2007. Supplier: ABB	
Cross Sound Cable	USA - New Haven, Connecticut; 41°17′12″N 72°54′8″W	USA - Shoreham, New York; 40°57′33″N 72°52′3″W	40 (40/0)	150	330	2002	IGBT	Buried underwater cable Supplier: ABB	
Neptune Cable	USA - Long Island (Hicksville) NY; 40°45′38″N 73°33′4″W	USA -Sayreville, NJ; 40°28′25.38″N 74°21′11.1″W	105 (105/0)	500	660	2007	Thyr	Supplier: Siemens	
Trans Bay Cable	USA - Pittsburg, California; 38°01′51″N 121°53′48″W	USA - San Francisco, CA; 37°45′17″N 122°23′09″W	85 (85/0)	200	400	2010	IGBT	First HVDC system using Modular Multi-Level Converter Supplier: Siemens, Pirelli	
Eastern Alberta Transmission Line	Canada – Newell, AB 50°30′41″N 112°01′02″W	Canada – Heathfield, AB 53°51′28″N 113°13′52″W	485 (0/485)	500	1000	2015/2016	Thyr	Supplier: Siemens	
Western Alberta Transmission Line	Canada – Genesee, AB 53°21′13″N 114°18′33″W	Canada – Langdon, AB 50°57′37″N 113°43′11″W	350 (0/350)	500	1000	2015	Thyr	Supplier: Siemens	
Nelson River Bipole 3	Canada - Keewatinohk, Manitoba; 56°39′25″N 93°51′14″W	Canada - Riel, Manitoba; 49°51′59″N 96°56′24″W	1324 (0/1324)	500	2000	2018	Thyr	Supplier: Siemens	
Labrador-Island Link	Canada - Muskrat Falls, NL	Canada - Soldiers Pond, NL	1135 (35/1100)	350	900	2017	Thyr	Drilling for cable landfall began in 2014. Supplier: Alstom Grid	
Maritime Link	Canada - Bottom Brook, NL 48°31′52″N 58°15′39″W	Canada - Woodbine, NS; 45°59′30″N 60°16′26″W	360 (170/190)	200	500	2017	IGBT	Right-of-way clearing began in 2014. Supplier: ABB	
New England Clean Power Link	USA - Alburgh, VT	USA - Ludlow, VT	248 (248/0)	320	1000	?		Connects to Quebec	
TransWest Express	USA – Sinclair, WY	USA – Boulder City, NV	1165 (0/1165)	600	3000	2027		Ground breaking in 2023	
Grain Belt Express	USA - Ford County, KS	USA - Sullivan County, IN	750 (0/750)	600	5000	?			
SOO Green	USA - Mason City, Iowa	USA - Plano, Illinois	563	525	2100	2023		Buried along railroad right-of-way Supplier: Siemens	
Champlain Hudson Power Express	Canada–New York border	USA - New York City	545	400	1250	2025		60% submarine under Lake Champlain and 40% underground	
New England Clean Energy Connect	USA - Beattie Twp, ME	USA - Lewiston, ME	314	320	1200	2026			
SunZia Transmission	USA – Torrance County, NM	USA – Pinal County, AZ	880	525	3000	2026		Project combined with 3,500 MW wind project	

== South America ==
Name	Converter station 1	Converter station 2	Total Length (Cable/Pole) (km)	Nominal Voltage (kV)	Power (MW)	Year	Type	Remarks	Ref
Itaipu 1	Brazil - Foz do Iguaçu, Paraná; 25°27′58″S 54°32′33″W	Brazil - São Roque, São Paulo; 23°40′2″S 47°6′19″W	785 (0/785)	600	3150	1984	Thyr	Supplier: ABB	
Itaipu 2	Brazil - Foz do Iguaçu, Paraná; 25°27′58″S 54°32′33″W	Brazil - São Roque, São Paulo; 23°40′2″S 47°6′19″W	805 (0/805)	600	3150	1987	Thyr	Supplier: ABB	
Rio Madeira	Brazil, Porto Velho; 08°54′53″S 63°57′27″W	Brazil, Araraquara; 21°49′59″S 48°20′52″W	2375 (0/2375)	600	7100	2013	Thyr	The longest transmission link in the world Suppliers: ABB, Alstom	
Xingu-Estreito (aka, Belo Monte 1)	Brazil - Anapu, Pará	Brazil - Ibiraci, Minas Gerais	2077 (0/2077)	800	4000	2017	Thyr	Supplier: SIEMENS	
Xingu-Rio (aka, Belo Monte 2)	Brazil - Pará	Brazil - Rio de Janeiro	2550	800	4000	2019	Thyr	Supplier: NARI/XD/CET	

== Back to back ==
Name	Location	Nominal Voltage (kV)	Power (MW)	Year	Type	Remarks	Ref
Carnegie Steel Company B2B	USA - Pittsburgh, Pennsylvania	?	?	?	Merc	built for an interconnection between 60 Hz-utility system and a 25 Hz System, dismantled	
Sakuma B2B	Japan - Sakuma; 35°04′57″N 137°47′56″E	125	300	1965	Merc	replaced in 1993 by new converter using light-triggered thyristors	
Eel River B2B	Canada - Eel River, NB; 48°01′05″N 66°26′39″W	80	320	1972	Thyr	life extension project 2014	
David A. Hamil B2B	USA - Stegall, Nebraska; 41°49′15″N 103°56′32″W	±50	100	1977	Thyr	Supplier: GE	
Shin Shinano B2B	Japan - Shin Shinano; 36°08′14″N 137°52′58″E	125	600	1977	Thyr	Supplier: Toshiba, Hitachi	
Acaray B2B	Paraguay - Ciudad de Este; 25°27′26″S 54°37′26″W	25.6	50	1981	Thyr		
Vyborg B2B	Russia - Vyborg; 60°40′49″N 28°55′7″E	±85	1065	1982	Thyr	extended up to 1420 MW in 2001	
Dürnrohr B2B	Austria - Dürnrohr; 48°19′46″N 15°52′48″E	145	550	1983	Thyr	shut down in October 1996, dismantled in 2007	
Artesia, New Mexico (Eddy County HVDC B2B) B2B	USA - Artesia, NM; 32°48′51.7″N 104°14′29.6″W	82	200	1983	Thyr		
Chateauguay B2B	Canada – Châteauguay, QC; 45°15′11″N 73°52′11″W	140	1000	1984	Thyr	Control system upgrade by ABB in 2009	
Oklaunion B2B	USA - Oklaunion, TX; 34°5′6″N 99°11′1″W	82	200	1984	Thyr	ABB replacement in 2014	
Blackwater, New Mexico B2B	USA - Blackwater, NM; 34°18′3″N 103°10′27″W	57	200	1984	Thyr	Valve cooling and control systems upgrade by ABB in 2009	
Madawaska, Quebec B2B	Canada - Dégelis, QC; 47°30′31″N 68°31′25″W	140	350	1985	Thyr		
Miles City, Montana B2B	USA - Miles City, MT; 46°24′31″N 105°47′36″W	82	200	1985	Thyr		
Highgate, VT B2B	USA - Highgate, VT; 44°56′17″N 73°3′15″W	56	200	1985	Thyr	Refurbishment by ABB in 2012,	
Uruguaiana B2B	Brazil - Uruguaiana; 29°48′22″S 57°0′17″W	17.9	53.9	1986	Thyr		
Broken Hill B2B	Australia - Broken Hill; 31°59′10″S 141°25′9″E	8.33	40	1986	Thyr		
Virginia Smith B2B	USA - Sidney, NE; 41°9′51″N 102°59′15″W	50	200	1988	Thyr		
Vindhyachal B2B	India - Vindhyachal; 24°05′38″N 82°40′44″E	176	500	1989	Thyr		
McNeill B2B	Canada - Mc Neill, AB; 50°35′56″N 110°01′25″W	42	150	1989	Thyr	Supplier: Alstom	
Wolmirstedt B2B	Germany - Wolmirstedt; 52°16′21″N 11°38′10″E	160	600	(1992)	Thyr	construction work was stopped after reunification, static inverter hall is today part of a recycling yard	
Etzenricht B2B	Germany - Etzenricht; 49°37′52″N 12°6′56″E	160	600	1993	Thyr	shut down in October 1995, dismantled in 2009	
Vienna-Southeast B2B	Austria - Vienna; 48°7′22″N 16°25′6″E	142	600	1993	Thyr	shut down in October 1996, dismantled in 2007	
Chandrapur B2B	India - Chandrapur; 20°5′21″N 79°8′36″E	205	2x500	1998	Thyr	Supplier: Alstom	
Welsh HVDC Converter Station B2B	USA - Titus County, TX; 33°03′30.3″N 94°50′36.54″W	162	600	1998	Thyr		
Garabi HVDC	Brazil - Garabi; 28°15′19″S 55°40′18″W	±70	2200	1999	Thyr	Brazil-Argentina Interconnection. Supplier: ABB In 2002, the second phase 'Garabi 2' was supplied by ABB .	
Vizag 1	India - Visakhapatnam Gazuwaka; 17°38′33″N 83°7′57″E	205	500	1999	Thyr	Supplier: Alstom	
Minami-Fukumitsu B2B	Japan - Minami - Fukumitsu; 36°29′46″N 136°54′57″E	125	300	1999	Thyr		
Rivera B2B	Uruguay - Rivera; 30°56′29″S 55°33′34″W	22	70	2000	Thyr	Supplier: Alstom	
Eagle Pass, Texas B2B	USA - Eagle Pass, TX; 28°42′58.8″N 100°29′26.88″W	15.9	36	2000	IGBT		
Sasaram B2B	India - Sasaram; 25°07′42″N 83°42′29″E	205	500	2003	Thyr	Supplier: Alstom	
Rapid City DC Tie B2B	USA - Rapid City, SD; 44°00′37″N 103°9′54″W	13	200	2003	Thyr		
Vizag 2	India - Visakhapatnam; 17°38′26″N 83°8′10″E	176	500	2005	Thyr	Installed at Gazuwaka. Supplier:ABB. This is similar in specs to Vizag I and connects the Eastern and Southern grids.	
Lingbao B2B	China - Lingbao; 34°32′56″N 110°50′49″E	168	360	2005	Thyr	Supplier: NR(Protection&Control), Extension project 2010: Supplier: ABB;C-EPRI Electric Power Engineering Co., Ltd	
Lamar Co., Colorado B2B	USA - Lamar, CO; 38°12′25.08″N 102°31′43.92″W	63.6	210	2005	Thyr	Supplier: Siemens; Combination of B2B HVDC & Grid Power Flow Controller (GPFC)	
Higashi-Shimuzu B2B	Japan - Shimuzu; 35°03′24″N 138°29′58″E	125	300	2006	Thyr		
Sharyland B2B	USA - Mission, TX; 26°10′01″N 98°19′25″W	21	150	2007	Thyr		
Al Fadhili B2B	Saudi Arabia - Al Fadhili; 26°53′52″N 49°20′47″E	222	3x600	2008	Thyr	Used mainly for Dynamic Reserve Power Sharing rather than economic energy transfer. Supplier: Alstom	
Outaouais B2B	Canada - Buckingham, QC; 45°36′01″N 75°26′47″W	315	2x625	2009	Thyr	Expected completion 2009. Supplier:ABB	
Heihe B2B	China - Heihe; 50°15′19″N 127°25′37″E	±125	750	2011	Thyr	Supplier: NR(Protection&Control)	
Gaoling B2B	China - Gaoling; 40°10′49″N 120°00′22″E	±500	1500	2008	Thyr		
Shandong - East B2B	China		1200	2011	Thyr		
Melo B2B	Uruguay - Melo; 32°25′02″S 54°05′34″W	±79	500	2011	Thyr	Supplier:Alstom	
North - Central B2B	China		1000	2012	Thyr		
Rio Madeira B2B	Brazil – Porto Velho; 8°54′46″S 63°57′27″W	100	600	2013	Thyr	Supplier: ABB	
Ridgefield B2B ( Hudson Project)	USA - Ridgefield, NJ; 40°49′56″N 74°00′44″W	185	660	2013	Thyr	Supplier: Siemens	
Bheramara B2B	Bangladesh – Bheramara 24°04′03″N 89°0′04″E	158	500	2013	Thyr		
Akhaltsikhe B2B	Georgia - Akhaltsikhe; 41°42′26″N 43°06′35″E	96	700	2013	Thyr	Supplier: Siemens	
Mackinac B2B	USA - Saint Ignace, MI; 45°51′31″N 84°44′18″W	70	200	2014	IGBT	Supplier: ABB	
Railroad DC Tie	USA - Mission, TX; 26°10′01″N 98°19′25″W	21	150	2014	Thyr		
Alytus B2B	Lithuania - Alytus; 54°26′19″N 23°58′02″E	±70	500	2015	Thyr		
Mogocha B2B	Russia - Mogocha; 53°43′30″N 119°47′22″E	±32	2x100	2017	IGBT		
Yu - E B2B	China-Chongqing, China-Hubei	±420	4x1250	2017	VSC-HVDC	Supplier: XJ Group Corporation(2x1250MW), C-EPRI Electric Power Engineering Co., Ltd(1x1250MW), Rongxin Power Electronic Co., Ltd. (1x1250MW)	
Khani B2B	Russia - Khani; 56°55′09″N 119°59′24″E	±32	2x100	2019	IGBT		
Van B2B	Turkiye - İran; 38°58′37″N 43°31′58″E	420	600	2021	IGBT	Supplier:NR-TEIAS	
Bentwisch B2B	Germany - Bentwisch; 54°06′04″N 12°12′56″E	±140	410	2019	IGBT		
Tres Amigas SuperStation	USA - Clovis, NM	?	5000	?	IGBT		

== Maps ==
=== Africa ===
HVDC links in Africa (interactive map) Existing Under construction Proposed

=== Australia and Oceania ===
HVDC links in Australia and Oceania (interactive map) Existing Under construction Proposed

=== Europe ===
HVDC links in Europe (interactive map) Existing Under construction Proposed

=== North America ===
HVDC links in North America (interactive map) Existing Under construction Proposed

=== South America ===
HVDC links in South America (interactive map) Existing Under construction Proposed

== See also ==
- Asian Super Grid
- Desertec
- Electrode line
- European super grid
- High-voltage direct current
- List of high voltage underground and submarine cables
- Lyon-Moutiers DC transmission scheme
- Scotland-Norway interconnector
- HVDC converter station
- Super grid
- Submarine power cable
- Transmission tower
- Uno Lamm
- Valve hall

== Sources ==
- Vijay K. Sood (31 May 2004). HVDC and FACTS Controllers: Applications Of Static Converters In Power Systems. Springer-Verlag. p. 2. ISBN 978-1-4020-7890-3.
