= List of high-voltage transmission links in Sweden =

List of high-voltage transmission links in Sweden.

== International links ==
Name	Substation SE	Substation 2	Length (km)	Voltage (kV)	Power (MW)	Operational	Remarks
Baltic Cable	Kruseberg	(Germany) Lübeck-Herrenwyk	262	450	600	1994	submarine HVDC
Bornholm Cable	Borrby	(Denmark) Hasle	43,5	60	60	Repaired 2004	submarine AC
Fenno-Skan	Dannebo	(Finland) Rauma	233	400	300	1989	submarine HVDC
Fenno–Skan 2	Finnböle, Gävle kommun	(Finland) Rauma	303	500	800	2011	submarine HVDC
Konti–Skan 1	Lindome	(Denmark) Vester Hassing	149	250	250	1965–2006	submarine HVDC
Konti–Skan 2	Lindome	(Denmark) Vester Hassing	149	300	300	1988	submarine HVDC
NordBalt	Nybro	(Lithuania) Klaipėda	450	330, 400	700	2015	submarine HVDC
SwePol	Stärnö	(Poland) Wierzbięcin	245	450	600	2000	submarine HVDC

In addition to the above named, submarine interconnectors Sweden has four AC submarine cables to Zealand, Denmark. These can import 1,700 MW and export 1,300 MW of power.

== National links ==
Name	Substation 1	Substation 2	Length (km)	Voltage (kV)	Power (MW)	Operational	Remarks
Gotland 2	Västervik	Yigne, Gotland	99.5	150	130	1983	submarine HVDC
Gotland 3	Västervik	Yigne, Gotland	98	150	130	1987	submarine HVDC
SydVästlänken	Barkeryd	Hurva	260	300	2 × 720	2021	HVDC
Visby–Näs	Näs, Gotland	Visby	70	80	50	1999	HVDC

== See also ==
- Electricity sector in Sweden
- List of power stations in Sweden
- Nordic energy market
- List of high-voltage transmission links in Denmark
- List of high-voltage transmission links in Lithuania
