= Hitachi Energy =

Technology company

- Formerly: Hitachi-ABB Power Grids
- Industry: Energy technology
- Predecessor: Hitachi Power Solutions Co. Ltd.,
- Founded: 1960
- Headquarters: Zurich, Switzerland
- Key people: Andreas Schierenbeck (CEO); Ismo Haka (CFO); Gerhard Salge (CTO)
- Revenue: US$16 billion (2024)
- Number of employees: 58,000
- Website: www.hitachienergy.com

Hitachi Energy Ltd. is a technology company headquartered in Zurich, Switzerland. The company's products include high-voltage equipment, transformers, and services for renewable energy.

The company is a subsidiary of multinational conglomerate Hitachi Ltd. The company was formerly known as Hitachi ABB Power Grids, following a joint venture with Hitachi Ltd. and ABB Power Grids in 2014, Hitachi Power solutions Co. Ltd was established in 1960 which has been integrated with Hitachi ABB Power Grids and entire stake was acquired by Hitachi from ABB and was rebranded in 2021 as Hitachi Energy Ltd.

== History ==
=== Predecessor companies and formation ===
In July 2020, following an agreement signed in 2018, ABB sold 80.1% of its Power Grids division to Hitachi Ltd. The resulting joint venture began operating as Hitachi ABB Power Grids.

In October 2021, Hitachi ABB Power Grids changed its company name to Hitachi Energy. In December 2022, it was confirmed that Hitachi acquired the remaining 19.9 percent shares from ABB Ltd.

== Notable projects ==
Hitachi was one of the key players in the HVDC segment in Japan even before the spinoff from ABB. Some of the Notable projects include Kii Channel HVDC (2000), Shin Shiano Frequency Converter (1977), HVDC Hokkaido–Honshu (1979) are some of the classic examples of Hitachi's contribution in LCC technology prior to the acquisition of ABB Power Grids division but their market mostly remain within Japan. Post acquisition and integration with the Energy division of Hitachi Power Solutions and then, the market expanded globally as Hitachi Energy.

Hitachi Energy has been involved in several notable projects, such as:

- Supplier for Changji-Guquan UHVDC transmission line in China, the world’s first transmission line operating at 1,100 kV voltage (2018)
- Fluoronitrile-based gas replacement for the greenhouse gas sulphur hexafluoride for National Grid in Kent, UK (2021)
- HVDC converter stations for high-voltage direct current submarine power cable North Sea Link (2021)
- Renewable energy microgrid for the remote community of Gull Bay First Nation in Canada (2022)
- Offshore platforms and onshore HVDC converter stations for electricity grid operator TenneT
- New Transformers for the AI Data Center in the United States

== See also ==
- Hitachi
- ABB
- Hitachi Energy Arena
