= Swedbank Arena =

Swedbank Arena may refer to:

- Strawberry Arena, Stockholm, home arena for the Sweden men's national football team and AIK Fotboll, known as Swedbank Arena between 2009 and 2012.
- Hägglunds Arena, Örnsköldsvik, home arena for Modo Hockey, known as Swedbank Arena between 2006 and 2009.
- Solid Park Arena, Västerås, home arena for Västerås SK Fotboll, known as Swedbank Park between 2008 and 2015.
- Stadion, Malmö, home arena for Malmö FF, known as Swedbank Stadion between 2007 and 2017.
