= Zhoushan (disambiguation) =

Zhoushan is a city in Zhejiang, China.

Zhoushan may also refer to:

- Zhoushan Islands, in Zhejiang, China
- Zhoushan Island, principal island of Zhoushan Islands
- 4925 Zhoushan, main belt minor planet
- Chusan Palm, or Trachycarpus fortunei, a palm native to central China
- HVDC Zhoushan, the first HVDC powerline in China
