= J. Robert Welsh Power Plant =

Coal power plant in Texas, US

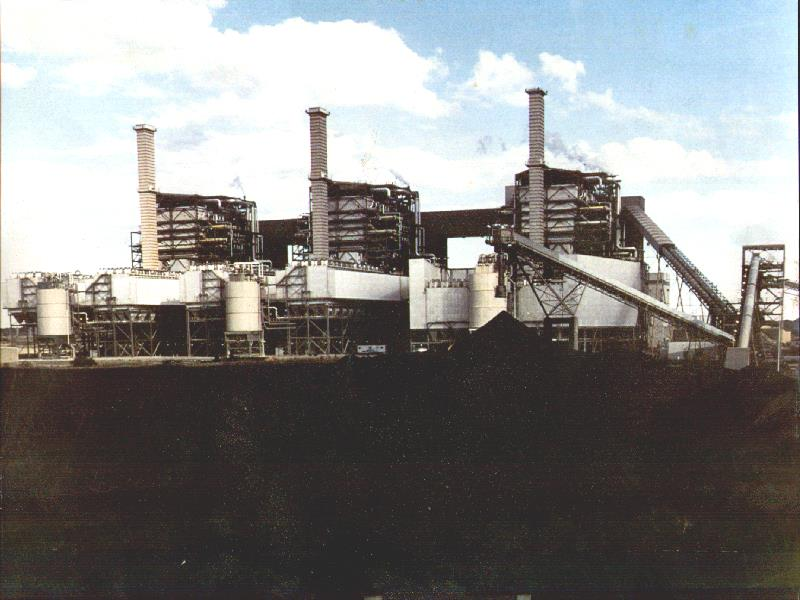
- J. Robert Welsh Power Plant
- Country: United States
- Location: Titus County, Texas, near Pittsburg, Texas
- Coordinates: 33°03′18″N 94°50′22″W
- Status: Operational
- Commission date: Unit 1: 1977; Unit 2: 1980; Unit 3: 1982
- Decommission date: Unit 2: 2016
- Owner: SWEPCO/AEP

Thermal power station
- Primary fuel: Powder River Basin sub-bituminous coal
- Cooling source: Welsh Reservoir

Power generation
- Units operational: 2
- Nameplate capacity: 1,056 MW

J. Robert Welsh Power Plant is a 1-gigawatt (1,056 MW), coal power plant located east of Pittsburg, Texas in Titus County, Texas. It is operated by SWEPCO, a subsidiary of AEP. The plant is named after J. Robert Welsh, a former President and Board Chairman of SWEPCO.

== History ==
Welsh Power Plant had three units constructed: Unit 1 began operations in 1977, Unit 2 began operations in 1980, and Unit 3 began operations in 1982. All three units were installed with boilers from Babcock & Wilcox and turbines from Westinghouse. Combined, the three units had an operating capacity of 1,674 MW.

In 2012, AEP announced they were reducing output at Unit 2 to coincide with the commencement of commercial operations at John W. Turk Jr. Coal Plant in Arkansas. Unit 2 was officially decommissioned in April 2016 as a part of a major retrofitting project to comply with the Environmental Protection Agency's (EPA) Mercury and Air Toxics Standards (MATS) for Units 1 and 3. It is currently scheduled to stop burning coal in 2028.

The remaining two units use sub-bituminous coal mined from the Powder River Basin shipped via rail. Close to it, there is Welsh HVDC Converter Station, a back-to-back HVDC station.

== See also ==
- List of power stations in Texas
