= ASEA =

Swedish manufacturer

Allmänna Svenska Elektriska Aktiebolaget

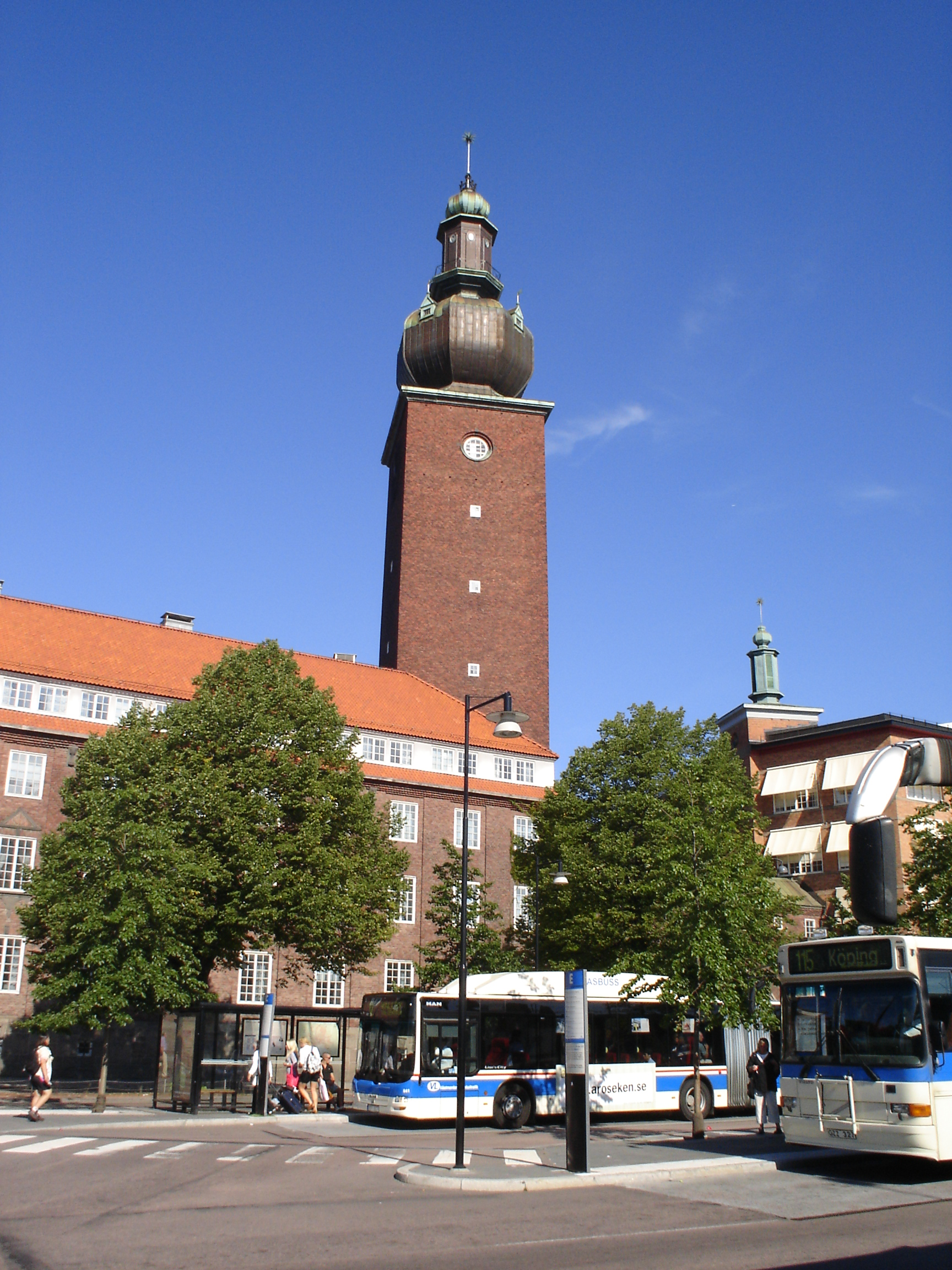
- ASEA HQ in Västerås
- Type: Publicly traded aktiebolag
- Industry: Electrical engineering
- Founded: 1883
- Defunct: 31 December 1987
- Fate: Merged with Brown Boveri to form ABB
- Successor: ABB
- Headquarters: Västerås, Västmanland, Sweden

Allmänna Svenska Elektriska Aktiebolaget (English translation: General Swedish Electrical Joint-Stock Company; Swedish abbreviation: ASEA) was a Swedish industrial company.

== History ==
ASEA swastika logo used from the late 19th century until 1933

ASEA was founded in 1883 by Ludvig Fredholm in Västerås as a manufacturer of electrical light and generators. After merging with Wenström's & Granström's Electrical Power Company (Wenströms & Granströms Elektriska Kraftbolag) the name was changed to Allmänna Svenska Elektriska Aktiebolaget, literally the "General Swedish Electrical Limited Company", or ASEA for short.

ASEA constructed and built all sorts of electrical appliances, equipment and machines during its time as an active company. E.g. flatirons, telephones, lights, ovens, workshop lathes and drill presses, contactors, electrical motors and motor circuit breakers, elevators, electrical locomotives, overhead cranes, power grid substations, transformers and hydroelectric generators. Many of the electrical locomotives, overhead cranes, power grid stations, transformers and hydroelectric generators built in the 1970s and 1980s are still in operation to this day (2026). Two examples that can be seen on a daily basis are the electric locomotives Rc 4 (of the freight train operator Green Cargo) and Rc 6 (of the passenger train operator SJ AB) that is running on the Swedish rail network.

In 1987, it announced a merger with the Swiss company Brown, Boveri & Cie (BBC) to form ABB. The merge took effect on 1 January 1988. After this merger, ABB acquired several companies, including the power transmission and distribution operations of the Westinghouse Electric Corporation and the Combustion Engineering Group.

- 1889 – the partner Jonas Wenström constructs 3-phased generators, motors and transformers.
- 1933 – The company removes the swastika from its logo, due to the symbol's association with Nazi Germany.
- 1953 – ASEA creates the first industrial diamonds.
- 1954 – HVDC Gotland project, first static high-voltage DC system
- 1960s – ASEA builds nine boiling water reactor nuclear power plants in Sweden
- 1968 – ASEA's elevator business is acquired by Kone
- 1974 – Industrial robots are introduced by ASEA
- 1987 – Acquires Finnish Oy Strömberg Ab
- 1988 – Merges with Brown, Boveri & Cie, Asea Cylinda laundry appliances branch bought by Finnish furniture maker Asko, renamed Asko ASEA.

== Business management ==
=== CEOs ===
- 1883–1891 – Ludvig Fredholm
- 1891–1903 – Göran Wenström
- 1903–1933 – Sigfrid Edström
- 1934–1942 – Arthur Lindén
- 1942–1949 – Thorsten Ericson
- 1949–1961 – Åke Vrethem
- 1961–1976 – Curt Nicolin
- 1976–1980 – Torsten L. Lindström
- 1980–1988 – Percy Barnevik

=== Chairman of the Board ===
- 1891–1891 – Ludvig Fredholm
- 1892–1909 – Oscar Fredrik Wijkman
- 1910–1914 – Oscar Wallenberg
- 1914–1933 – Sten Ankarcrona
- 1934–1949 – Sigfrid Edström
- 1949–1956 – Thorsten Ericson
- 1956–1976 – Marcus Wallenberg
- 1976–1991 – Curt Nicolin

== See also ==
- ASEA IRB – robot
- Asko
- Hitachi Energy
- Sigfrid Edström
- Uno Lamm
