= J. Robert Welsh =

Louisiana electric utilities executive (1901–1990)

John Robert Welsh (May 18, 1901 – July 29, 1990) was an electric utilities executive and noted civic leader of northwest Louisiana in the mid-twentieth century. The J. Robert Welsh Power Plant is named in his honor.

Welsh was born in Peoria, Illinois, and graduated from the University of Illinois in 1924, after which he worked as a superintendent and chief engineer for the electrical utility (transmission line and substation) construction contractor L. E. Myers Company, until 1940. At that time, he went to work for SWEPCO as a superintendent and vice president-general manager, remaining with the company until his retirement in 1971. Welsh served as SWEPCO President from 1954 to 1966, and board chairman from 1966 to 1971. He also served as president of the Southwest Atomic Energy Associates, as director of the Texas Atomic Energy Research Foundation (a Texas consortium of ten electrical power companies), and as a member of the board of directors of the National Association of Manufacturers, among numerous other roles at regional and national levels in the utilities industry.

Welsh and his wife, Marcella, had seven children. One of their sons, John Robert "Jack" Welsh, was a Jesuit priest. Likewise, one of their five daughters, Marietta Welsh (1927 - 2017), was a Roman Catholic nun who served as the Mother Superior of the St. Vincent's convent and as the Superior General of the Daughters of the Cross, the Order which established 21 Catholic schools throughout north Louisiana, including St John Berchmans Catholic [elementary and middle] school and the now defunct all-girl high school St. Vincent's Academy (1868 - 1988), both in Shreveport.

From 1969 to 1977, Welsh Sr., served as the first president of the Board of Trustees of Jesuit High School of Shreveport Corporation, which saved the all-male institution, founded in 1902 (now known as the coeducational Loyola College Prep), from closing by providing the necessary financial oversight after the Society of Jesus made the decision to pull out of the school. Welsh's son Jack had earlier attended this institution (as St. John's High School) and returned to teach there (from 1959 to 1976), subsequently serving as president and rector. J. Robert Welsh was also a board member of Centenary College of Louisiana.

The title of Knight of the Order of St. Gregory the Great, one of the highest papal honors bestowed on a Roman Catholic lay person, was conferred on him in 1956 by Bishop Charles P. Greco, by direction of Pope Pius XII in honor of Welsh's exemplary life of faith and service to the Church. Welsh was also very active in public affairs and received several secular awards from the local community in recognition of his municipal efforts. J. Robert Welsh died on July 29, 1990, at the age of 89.
