= SydVästlänken =

SydVästlänken South–West Link
- Location of SydVästlänken; South–West Link

Location
- Country: Sweden, Norway
- Province: Närke, Skåne, Västergötland, Östergötland, Småland
- General direction: north–south, west–south
- From: Hallsberg in Närke; Oslo
- Passes through: Barkeryd, Nässjö 57°44′52″N 14°39′19″E
- To: Hurva, Hörby 55°49′59″N 13°36′08″E

Ownership information
- Operator: Svenska kraftnät, Statnett

Construction information
- Expected: August 2021

Technical information
- Type: overhead line; subsoil cable
- Current type: combined HVDC and HVAC
- Capacity: 1,200 MW
- AC voltage: 400 kV
- DC voltage: 300 kV

SydVästlänken (English: South–West Link) is a project for reinforcement of power grids in Southern Sweden and Oslo area in Norway. The project is to be implemented by Swedish and Norwegian national grids operators Svenska kraftnät and Statnett.

== Aim ==
The southern part of the Nordic power grid between Sweden and Norway is relatively vulnerable to disruptions and quite often there are bottlenecks for power transmission. While in dry periods and low consumption periods problems are related to the West coast in Sweden, in periods with high hydroproduction and peak consumption problems are mainly related to the grid in Oslo area in Norway (the so-called Hasle-trappen).

Western branch will not be built 2013-04-29

Swedish power grid, together with Statnett decided not to implement the project south-western branch of the link between backbone stations Barkeryd and Tveiten. New calculations show that the benefits have been reduced significantly compared with the original analyzes.

The aim of SydVästlänken is to increase the transmission capacity and the robustness of the transmission system in this area. Increased capacity and flexibility of the transmission is particularly import for facilitation of the increased wind power generation.

== History ==
The project was proposed in 2005 when Svenska kraftnät made decision to construct the Sydlänken (Southern Link), a reinforcement of the transmission grid between the Swedish provinces Närke and Skåne. In January 2008, Svenska kraftnät and Statnett proposed to expand this project by integrating it with a new VSC HVDC connection between Norway and Sweden. Correspondingly, the project was renamed SydVästlänken. Technical issues continued to plague the construction, whose date of completion was postponed no less than 22 times before getting taken into commercial use in July 2021. Since then, numerous complaints about excessive noise from the facilities has been made, necessitating further measures to be taken.

== Description ==
The SydVästlänken will include sections:

- 260 kilometres long HVDC line from the Barkeryd substation (57°44′52″N 14°39′19″E) near Nässjö in Jönköping area to the Hurva substation (55°49′59″N 13°36′08″E) near Hörby in Skåne. The line will be built in its first 10 kilometres long section from Barkeryd substation to Nässjö as 10 kilometres long underground line. Between Nässjö ( terminal at: 57°39′50.2″N 14°40′8.7″E) and Värnamo ( terminal at: 57°13′46.2″N 14°4′51.8″E) it will be constructed as 63 kilometres long overhead line using two 910 mm^{2} Al59 conductors per pole, fixed with 4 metres long insulators on the pylons. From Värnamo to Hurva substation the line will be implemented again as underground cable.
- HVDC underground cable from Oslo area to the Barkeryd substation.
- a new 400 kV HVAC power line replacing an existing 220 kV line between Hallsberg in Närke and Nässjö.

The Barkeryd–Hurva and Barkeryd–Hallsberg sections form the southern branch of the project (former Sydlänken). The Barkeryd–Oslo section forms the western branch. Both branches will have capacity of 1,200 MW. Construction of the southern branch to be start in 2012 with completion in 2017. Construction of the western branch to be start in 2013 and it is expected to be completed in 2017.

== Waypoints ==
List of waypoints

Overhead Line in Sweden

- 57.663812°N 14.669012°E
- 57.661957°N 14.667968°E
- 57.658755°N 14.662406°E
- 57.628781°N 14.582398°E
- 57.624827°N 14.575577°E
- 57.593477°N 14.533496°E
- 57.585564°N 14.522982°E
- 57.560518°N 14.484173°E
- 57.523693°N 14.452576°E
- 57.500396°N 14.419714°E
- 57.465657°N 14.370943°E
- 57.405320°N 14.336278°E
- 57.331763°N 14.248393°E
- 57.300086°N 14.221504°E
- 57.250825°N 14.161331°E
- 57.229584°N 14.081206°E
