= Black Sea Transmission Network =

Location
- Country: Georgia; Turkey
- General direction: north–south
- From: Gardabani; Zestaponi
- Passes through: Akhaltsikhe
- To: Borçka

Ownership information
- Operator: Energotrans

Construction information
- Contractors: Siemens
- Construction started: 2010
- Expected: 2013

Technical information
- Type: overhead line
- Current type: AC/HVDC/AC
- Total length: 283 km (176 mi)
- Capacity: 700 MW
- AC voltage: 500/400 kV
- DC voltage: 96 kV
- No. of circuits: 1

The Black Sea Transmission Network is a project for electric power transmission from Georgia to Turkey.

In 2014, Inter RAO started supplying electricity from Russia to the energy system of Georgia for subsequent sale in Turkey. The supplies became possible after the commissioning of the 400 kV Akhaltsikhe-Borçka interstate power transmission line with a direct current insertion connecting the energy systems of Georgia and Turkey.

Russian electricity supplies to Turkey continue to be transported via Georgia. According to Inter RAO, exports to the Turkish market nearly quadrupled in 2025 compared to 2024, reaching 231 million kWh.

== Technical description ==
The project foresees a rehabilitation and expansion of the existing transmission system. An overhead transmission line with a total length of 247 kilometres (153 mi) will be built from the existing Gardabani and Zestaponi substations to the new Akhaltsikhe substation situated at 41°42′26″N 43°06′35″E. The line between Gardabani and Akhaltsikhe will be 187 kilometres (116 mi), of which 86 kilometres (53 mi) is a rehabilitation of the existing line and 101 kilometres (63 mi) will be a new line. The line between Zestaponi and Akhaltsikhe is 59 kilometres (37 mi) long, of which 35 kilometres (22 mi) is a rehabilitation of the existing line and 24 kilometres (15 mi) will be a new line. The 500 kV overhead line will be a single-circuit transmission line.

At Akhaltsikhe substation two back-to-back high-voltage direct current stations, each with a capacity of 350 MW will be installed. A 400 kV AC overhead line will connect it with Borçka substation in Turkey. About 35 kilometres (22 mi) of it will run in the territory of Georgia. The first HVDC back-to-back station would be operational in May 2012 and the second one in May 2013. This link will be built by Siemens.

== Financing ==
The project is financed by several European finance institutions. The European Investment Bank and the European Bank for Reconstruction and Development lend €80 million both while the German development bank KfW provides €100 million in the form of a grant (€25 million) and a long-term loan (€75 million, €20 million Development Bank of Austria, Oesterreichische Entwicklungsbank (OeEB) risk participation). The project is developed by the Georgian state-owned transmission system operator Energotrans.

== See also ==
- List of HVDC Projects
- Energy in Georgia (country)
