= HVDC Gezhouba–Shanghai =

HVDC power line in Hubei Province and Shanghai City, China

Location
- Country: China
- Province: Hubei, Anhui
- Coordinates: 30°43′44″N 111°14′39″E; 30°57′22″N 121°24′48″E
- General direction: west–east
- From: Gezhouba
- To: Nanqiao

Ownership information
- Operator: China Southern Power Grid

Construction information
- Substation manufacturer: ABB
- Contractors: ABB, Siemens
- Construction started: 1985
- Commissioned: 1989

Technical information
- Type: overhead transmission line
- Current type: HVDC
- Total length: 1,046 km (650 mi)
- Capacity: 1,200 MW
- AC voltage: 500 kV (both ends)
- DC voltage: ±500 kV
- No. of poles: 2

The HVDC Gezhouba–Shanghai is a high voltage direct current electric power transmission system between Gezhouba and Nanqiao near Shanghai, China put in service in 1989. The bipolar 1,046-kilometre (650 mi) line is rated at 500 kV and a maximum power of 1,200 MW.

Between 2008 and 2011 the towers of the most part of the line, which were almost guyed towers capable of carrying two conductors, were replaced by new free-standing line towers for 4 conductors in order to install the conductors for the HVDC Hubei-Shanghai on them. This 970 km long line, which is also a bipolar HVDC with an operating voltage of 500 kV runs from Jingmen to Fenjing and has a transmission capacity of 3000 MW.

HVDC Hubei-Shanghai shares also the grounding electrode of HVDC Gezhouba–Shanghai for the Nanqiao terminal. For most of its length, the electrode line of HVDC Gezhouba–Shanghai carries also the electrode line of HVDC Hubei-Shanghai. HVDC Gezhouba–Shanghai carries between Fenjing and Nanqiao also the electrode line of HVDC Hubei-Shanghai in most part of its length on its towers.

The grounding electrode of HVDC Hubei-Shanghai at Chujiahu is also used by HVDC Three Gorges-Changzhou.

== Sites ==
Site	Coordinates
China - Gezhouba Static Inverter Plant ( GeSha)	30°43′44″N 111°14′39″E
China - Jingmen Static Inverter Plant ( HVDC Hubei - Shanghai)	30°49′21″N 112°07′15″E
China - Chujiahu Grounding Electrode ( HVDC Hubei - Shanghai)	30°36′26″N 111°54′51″E
China - Liufangtei HVDC Gezhouba–Shanghai HVDC Hubei - Shanghai Split	30°43′2″N 112°41′57″E
China - HVDC Gezhouba - Shanghai (old) - Maiyuan PLC-Repeating Station	30°18′41″N 116°28′10″E
China - Fenjing HVDC Gezhouba–Shanghai HVDC Hubei - Shanghai Split	30°51′53″N 121°00′50″E
China - Fenjing Static Inverter Plant ( HVDC Hubei - Shanghai)	30°52′00″N 121°00′58″E
China - Caijiacun HVDC Gezhouba–Shanghai HVDC Hubei - Shanghai electrode line split	30°52′04″N 121°01′13″E
China - Wangjiatiantou HVDC Gezhouba–Shanghai HVDC Hubei - Shanghai - electrode line split	30°56′54″N 121°24′32″E
China - Malucun HVDC Gezhouba–Shanghai HVDC Hubei - Shanghai - electrode line split	30°57′00″N 121°24′01″E
China - Nan Qiao Static Inverter Plant ( GeSha)	30°57′22″N 121°24′48″E
China - Liaoxiangcun HVDC Gezhouba–Shanghai HVDC Hubei - Shanghai - ground electrode	30°50′52″N 121°38′33″E
