= Fenno–Skan =

Swedish-Finnish high voltage direct current transmission

- Location of Fenno–Skan

Location
- Country: Finland, Sweden
- Coordinates: 61°09′07″N 21°37′32″E; 61°04′36″N 21°18′17″E; 60°35′51″N 17°57′46″E; 60°24′14″N 18°08′10″E
- From: Rauma, Finland
- Passes through: Gulf of Bothnia
- To: Dannebo, Sweden

Ownership information
- Operator: Fingrid, Svenska Kraftnät

Construction information
- Cable manufacturer: ABB/Nexans
- Commissioned: 1989/2011

Technical information
- Type: subsea cable
- Current type: HVDC
- Total length: 233 + 300 km (145 + 186 mi)
- Capacity: 500 MW + 800 MW
- AC voltage: 400 kV
- DC voltage: 400 kV + 500 kV
- No. of poles: 2

Fenno–Skan is the designation of the high voltage direct current transmission between Dannebo in Sweden and Rauma in Finland.

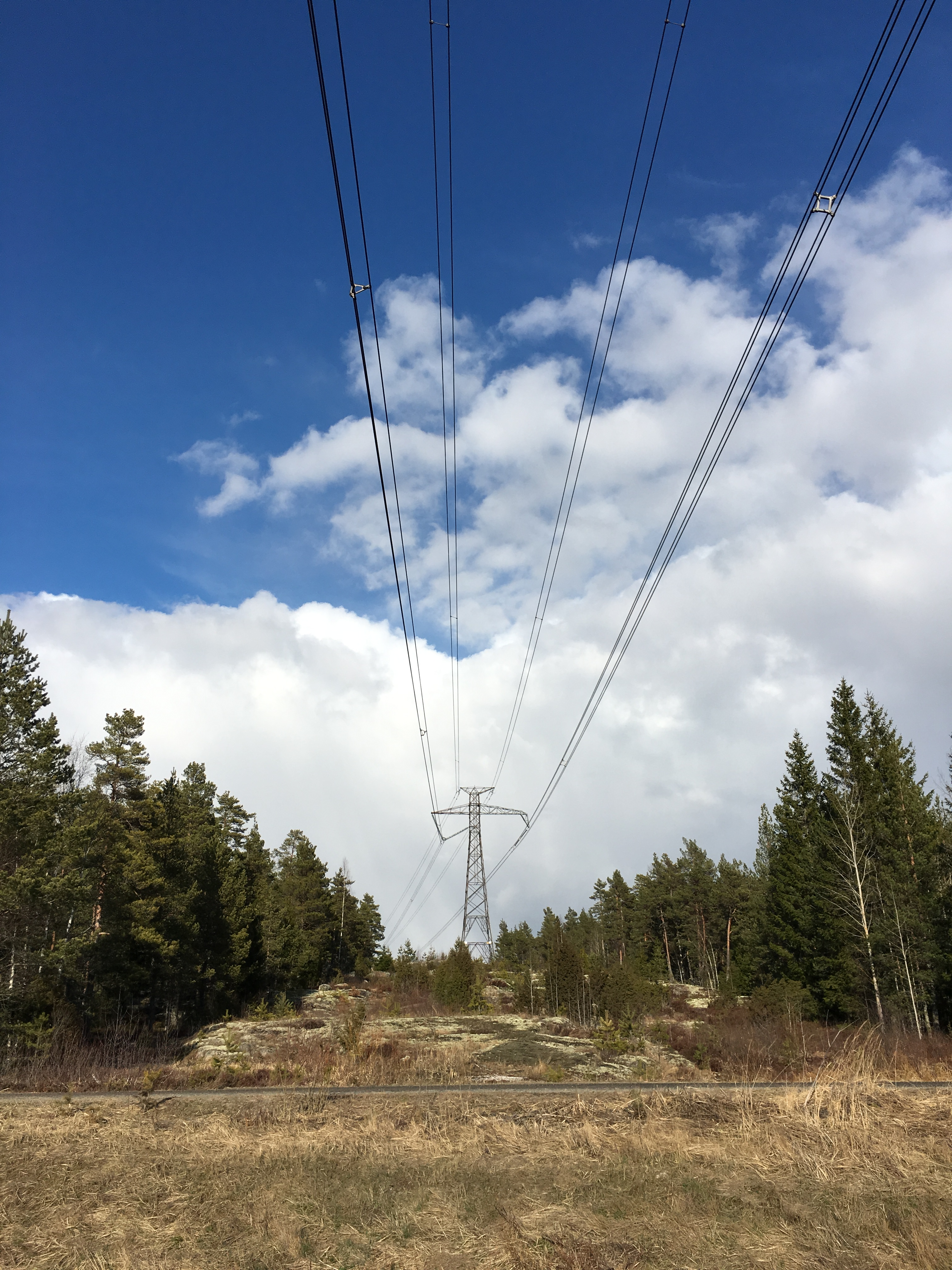
Fenno-Skan HVDC power line, running over Turku-Pori route in Finland. Unlike in 3-phase AC power transfer, only two wires instead of three are required (in addition to the lightning protection wires, which on the Finnish side serve as electrode line).

== History ==
Fenno–Skan was inaugurated in 1989. Taken into commercial operation in November 1989, Fenno–Skan was the longest submarine power cable in the world. It was also the first HVDC cable with 400 kV voltage and a rated power of 500 MW.

== Description ==
The Fenno–Skan is a monopolar system with a maximum transmission rate of 550 megawatts (MW) at a voltage of 400 kV. It would be converted to become a bipole. The cable was manufactured partly by ABB and partly by Nexans.

The total length of Fenno–Skan is 233 kilometres (145 mi), of which 200 kilometres (120 mi) is a submarine cable on the bottom of the Gulf of Bothnia. At the Swedish end the cable directly enters the Dannebo static inverter plant near the Forsmark nuclear power station about 1 kilometre (0.62 mi) from the coast at 60°24'16"N 18°8'4"E. However, the electrode line from the static inverter plant to the ground electrode situated at 60°35'51"N 17°57'46"E is built as overhead line. It is a line with two conductors on wooden poles, which runs partly on its course past another powerline.

There is a 33 kilometres (21 mi) long overhead line section from the coast in Finland at 61°4'37" N, 21°18'18" E to the static inverter station in Rauma, situated at 61°9′7″N 21°37′32″E.

The ground electrode in Finland is situated near Rantala. From there an overhead electrode line on wooden poles runs first in a northeastern, then in a northern direction until Ruokalho, where it meets the overhead line with two high voltage conductors. From Ruokalho to Rauma static inverter plant the electrode line is fixed on a small crossbar above the high voltage conductors of Fenno–Skan and serves as ground conductor. In opposite to a normal ground conductor it is mounted on insulators equipped with surge arrestors.

== Operators ==
Fenno–Skan is operated by the Finnish and Swedish transmission system operators Fingrid and Svenska Kraftnät.

== Fenno–Skan 2 ==
Fenno–Skan 2 is the second cable of the Finland–Sweden submarine power connection. 800 MW, 500 kV subsea transmission connection was laid in 2011 by the cable laying ship SC Skagerrak, and it cost €150 million. The cable was manufactured by Nexans Norwegian plant in Halden. Two converter stations were supplied by ABB. Compared with Fenno–Skan 1, the Swedish converter station is located in Finnböle. The Fenno–Skan 2 cable is connected to the converter station by a 70 kilometres (43 mi) long DC overhead line. The pylons of this line are "classic HVDC pylons" with a single crossbar carrying two conductors, which consist of a bundle of three or four ropes, on 5.5 metres (18 ft) long insulators, on the Finnish side. On the Swedish side, the towers carry the pole conductor (long insulators) and the neutral conductor (short insulators) from Finnböle to the Dannebo (Fenno-Skan 1) converter station.

Fenno–Skan 2 crosses the traction current power line Tierp-Gävle and the parallel-running three phase 220 kV AC powerline Mehedeby-Gävle west of Mehedeby approximately at 60°28′45.2″N 17°14′11″E. This is the only crossing of an HVDC powerline and a single-phase AC powerline in the world and the only place where all kinds of electric transmission systems, three phase AC powerline, single phase AC powerline and HVDC come close together.

Fenno–Skan 2 became fully operational on 16 December 2011.

In February 2012 a German ship laid anchor on top of the cable, damaging it. The cost to Finnish consumer and industry in the following two months in higher electricity prices was estimated to be 80 million €.

== Sites ==
Site	Coordinates
Finnböle HVDC Static Inverter	60°25′30″N 17°3′42″E
Dannebo HVDC Static Inverter	60°24′14″N 18°08′10″E
Hallen Electrode Line Terminal (Sweden)	60°35′51″N 17°57′46″E
Rihtniemi Cable Terminal (Finland)	61°04′36″N 21°18′17″E
Lautakari Electrode Line Terminal (Finland)	60°59′47″N 21°22′4″E
Ruokalho Electrode Line Branch (Finland)	61°02′31″N 21°24′30″E
Rauma HVDC Static Inverter Plant	61°09′07″N 21°37′32″E

== Waypoints ==
List of waypoints

Fenno–Skan 2 in Sweden

- 60.42641°N 17.06308°E
- 60.42737°N 17.0737°E
- 60.42808°N 17.07458°E
- 60.43771°N 17.1862°E
- 60.43834°N 17.19734°E
- 60.4468°N 17.19749°E
- 60.45505°N 17.19982°E
- 60.46112°N 17.20498°E
- 60.46427°N 17.22127°E
- 60.49814°N 17.25552°E
- 60.50465°N 17.2808°E
- 60.49675°N 17.30326°E
- 60.47102°N 17.38863°E
- 60.4608°N 17.41285°E
- 60.458°N 17.42207°E
- 60.43392°N 17.5582°E
- 60.42314°N 17.5961°E
- 60.40409°N 17.67745°E
- 60.40033°N 17.7271°E
- 60.39715°N 17.75738°E
- 60.39558°N 17.84802°E
- 60.38345°N 17.93076°E
- 60.37811°N 18.05062°E
- 60.3769982°N 18.0662833°E
- 60.37181°N 18.0819°E
- 60.39733°N 18.14553°E

Underground cable in Sweden

- 60.4044008°N 18.1339216°E
- 60.4046234°N 18.1338787°E
- 60.4121254°N 18.1620955°E

Electrode line in Sweden

- 60.4041465°N 18.1337285°E
- 60.4037756°N 18.121047°E
- 60.4380038°N 17.963537°E
- 60.4787149°N 17.944783°E
- 60.4997462°N 17.9313505°E
- 60.5381268°N 17.9347837°E
- 60.569417°N 17.9590416°E
- 60.5784621°N 17.9619867°E
- 60.5947039°N 17.9637194°E
- 60.5976721°N 17.9628074°E

Overhead line in Finland

- 61.0768721°N 21.3048828°E
- 61.0755697°N 21.3062346°E
- 61.0737015°N 21.3093835°E
- 61.0647694°N 21.327585°E
- 61.0610603°N 21.3418329°E
- 61.0527711°N 21.3615686°E
- 61.0494917°N 21.3738155°E
- 61.0423526°N 21.3911211°E
- 61.0409761°N 21.4390844°E
- 61.0428071°N 21.4682776°E
- 61.0437993°N 21.4744788°E
- 61.0418826°N 21.408239°E
- 61.0470273°N 21.4859426°E
- 61.0510574°N 21.496489°E
- 61.0528853°N 21.5024328°E
- 61.0568316°N 21.5185046°E
- 61.0609539°N 21.5301776°E
- 61.0624178°N 21.5422797°E
- 61.065439°N 21.5552831°E
- 61.0676813°N 21.56039°E
- 61.0692903°N 21.5652609°E
- 61.0705878°N 21.5724921°E
- 61.0717399°N 21.5857959°E
- 61.0715635°N 21.5927911°E
- 61.0694979°N 21.6239691°E
- 61.0688543°N 21.6401911°E
- 61.0692695°N 21.6489029°E
- 61.0734628°N 21.6713905°E
- 61.075497°N 21.6773558°E
- 61.0822421°N 21.6895866°E
- 61.0869524°N 21.7003584°E
- 61.0884878°N 21.7033195°E
- 61.1091044°N 21.6894794°E
- 61.1181432°N 21.6817975°E
- 61.1288061°N 21.6654038°E
- 61.1377461°N 21.6437531°E
- 61.145151°N 21.6315651°E
- 61.1514982°N 21.6243339°E

Electrode line in Finland

- 60.9963271°N 21.3677269°E
- 61.0005951°N 21.3837451°E
- 61.0033127°N 21.3911051°E
- 61.004254°N 21.3982773°E
- 61.0045713°N 21.3989747°E
- 61.01351°N 21.402483°E
- 61.0183085°N 21.4075309°E
- 61.0239847°N 21.4090598°E
- 61.0286414°N 21.4064527°E
- 61.0418826°N 21.408239°E

== See also ==
- Energy in Finland
- Energy in Sweden
- List of high-voltage transmission links in Sweden
- Estlink, cable between Estonia and Finland
- LitPol Link, cable between Lithuania and Poland
