= HVDC Tjæreborg =

HVDC transmission line in Denmark

The HVDC Tjæreborg is a 4.3 kilometre long bipolar high-voltage direct current (HVDC) electric power transmission line for demonstrating and testing DC interconnection of a wind park to the Danish power grid. The line was constructed to connect an existing onshore wind park consisting of 4 windmills in Tjæreborg Enge to the grid through an additional DC line. Thus the mills can be connected to the grid by both the new HVDC, the old AC or a combination of both lines.

The HVDC Tjæreborg was commissioned in 2000 and is designed for a voltage of 9 kV and a maximum power rating of 7.2 megawatt.

The technology of HVDC allows a better regulation of power peaks.

== Sites ==
Site	Coordinates
Enge Static Inverter Plant	55°26′52″N 8°35′34″E
Tjæreborg Static Inverter Plant	55°28′07″N 8°33′36″E
