= Al-Fadhili back-to-back HVDC converter station =

Location
- Country: Saudi Arabia
- Coordinates: 26°53′52″N 49°20′47″E

Ownership information
- Owner: Gulf Cooperation Council Interconnection Authority (GCCIA).

Construction information
- Substation installer: Areva T&D
- Commissioned: 2009

Technical information
- Type: Back to Back
- Current type: HVDC
- Total length: 0 km (0 mi)
- Capacity: 3 x 600 MW
- DC voltage: 222 kV
- No. of poles: 3

The Al-Fadhili back-to-back HVDC station is a back-to-back HVDC connection between Saudi Arabia, whose grid operates at 60 Hz, and its neighbouring Gulf states which have 50 Hz grids. The station is located in Saudi Arabia, approximately 100 km north-west of Dammam, but was built for and owned by Gulf Cooperation Council Interconnection Authority (GCCIA). The converter station was built by Areva T&D, now Alstom Grid, between 2006 and 2009.

GCCIA is constructing a 400 kV, 50 Hz AC transmission line to interconnect Kuwait, Bahrain and Qatar through Saudi Arabia. Later phases will also connect Oman and United Arab Emirates. The Al-Fadhili HVDC system allows power to be exchanged between the 50 Hz GCCIA system and Saudi Electricity Company system.

The converter station consists three identical poles, each with a nominal power transmission rating of 600 MW and an overload rating of 660 MW. Each pole has nominal DC voltage and current ratings of 222 kV, 2776 A.

Unlike most HVDC systems, which are designed to be used more or less continuously for transmission of power, the Al-Fadhili system is normally intended to remain in standby mode, only transmitting power between the two systems after a major loss of generation in one system. The converter poles are normally kept blocked but the control systems continuously monitor the frequencies of the two grids and, upon detection of a sudden change of frequency, deblock one or two poles as needed to restore the shortage of power. This allows Spinning reserve to be shared between the two system and as a result the concept is known as Dynamic Reserve Power Sharing (DRPS). With a total power rating of 1800 MW, the Al-Fadhili system was, on completion, the largest HVDC back-to-back system in the world and the first HVDC system in the Middle East.

== See also ==
- High-voltage direct current
- HVDC converter
- HVDC converter station
