= Hitachi Energy Arena =

Multi-use stadium in Västerås, Sweden

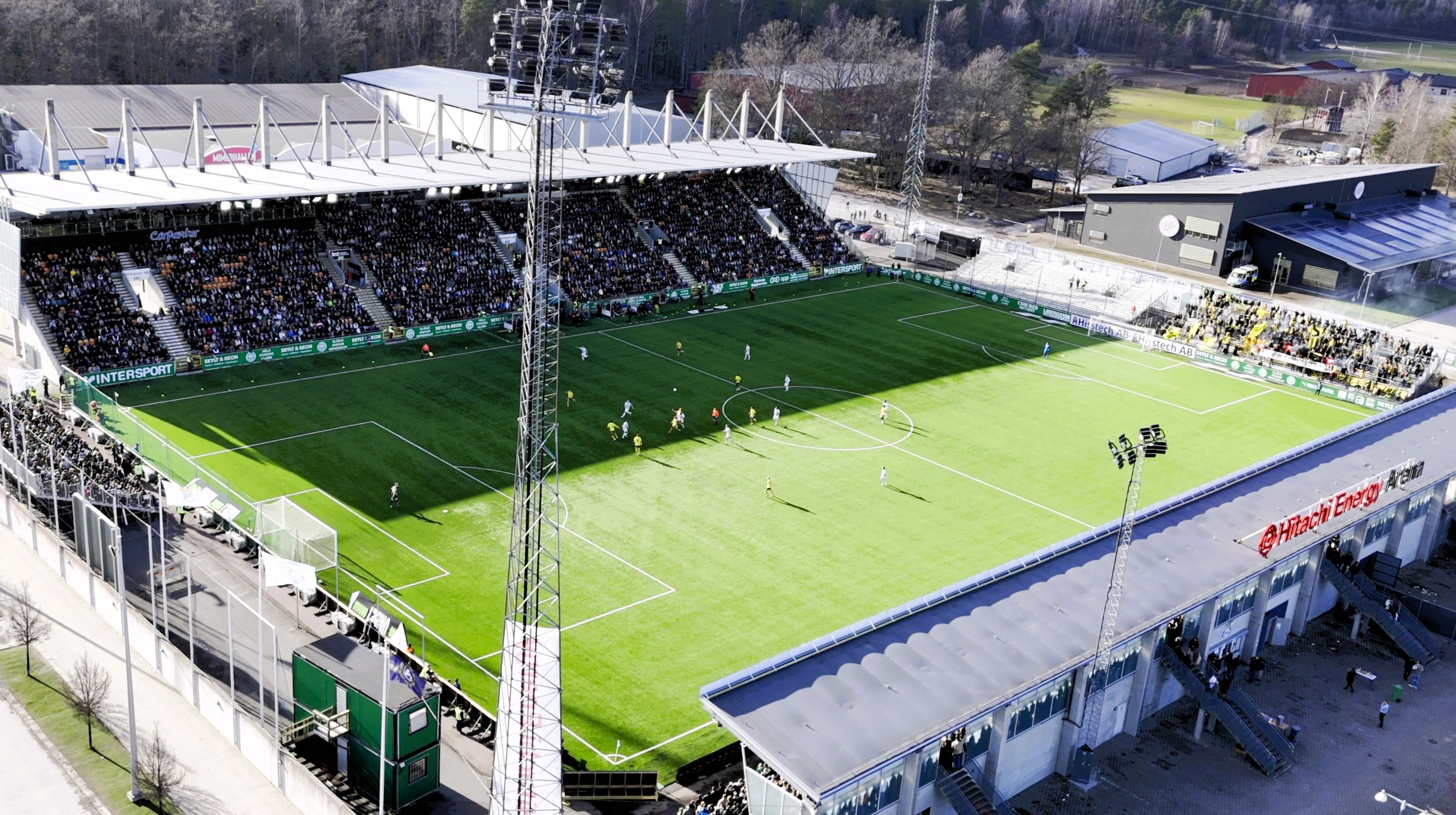
- Interactive map of Hitachi Energy Arena
- Full name: Hitachi Energy Arena
- Former names: Swedbank Park, Solid Park Arena, Iver Arena
- Location: Västerås, Sweden
- Coordinates: 59.627535°N 16.530669°E
- Capacity: 8,750

Construction
- Opened: April 27, 2008

Tenants
- Västerås SK Fotboll Syrianska IF Kerburan; Gideonsbergs IF IFK Västerås

Hitachi Energy Arena, previously known as Swedbank Park, Solid Park Arena and Iver Arena, is a multi-use stadium in Västerås, Sweden. It is currently used mostly for football matches and is the home ground of Västerås SK Fotboll. The stadium holds 8,900 people and was opened in 2008. It replaced Arosvallen as the home of Västerås SK.

In January 2016 there was a name change from Swedbank Park to Solid Park Arena after IT company Solid Park bought the naming rights.

In early 2020 the IT company Iver bought Solid Park and the naming rights for the arena were included in the deal.

In 2023 Hitachi Energy bought the naming rights for the arena.

In European competitions, the stadium is known as Västerås SK Arena due to advertising rules.
