= Uno Lamm =

Swedish electrical engineer and inventor

August Uno Lamm (May 22, 1904 – June 1, 1989) was a Swedish electrical engineer and inventor. He was sometimes called "The Father of High Voltage Direct Current" power transmission. During his career, Lamm obtained 150 patents. In 1980 the Institute of Electrical and Electronics Engineers (IEEE) developed the Uno Lamm High Voltage Direct Current Award for contributions to the field of high voltage electrical engineering.

== Biography ==
Lamm was born in Gothenburg, Sweden to Fredrik Hjalmar Lamm and Aino Maria Lovisa Wilhelmina Wijkander. He obtained his master's degree at KTH Royal Institute of Technology in Stockholm in 1927. After a short time in compulsory military service he joined ASEA, the Swedish electrical conglomerate, initially working in their training program. In 1929 he was made manager of the project to develop a high-voltage mercury arc valve. Valves at the time operated only up to about 2500 volts, and if higher-voltage valves were available they could have practical use in the transmission of large quantities of electric energy over long distances.

In 1943 Lamm obtained his Ph.D. from the Royal Institute of Technology, studying part-time while developing the mercury arc valve. After twenty years or so of development work to produce a valve with the necessary rating for HVDC transmission, ASEA obtained a contract for the HVDC Gotland project in 1950, which when completed in 1955 became the first modern fully commercial HVDC system.

In 1955 Lamm was made head of the ASEA project to develop Sweden's first commercial nuclear reactors. In 1961 Lamm moved to California and was appointed by ASEA in 1961 to work with General Electric on the Pacific DC Intertie project, which combined AC and HVDC transmission systems to move electrical energy from the hydroelectric generators of the Pacific Northwest to consumers in southern California. By the end of 1964 Lamm had moved to southern California. From 1967 to 1988 he served as an IEEE director at large.

== Legacy ==
During his career Lamm wrote approximately 80 technical papers. He also wrote extensively on social issues in articles published in Swedish newspapers and magazines, often critical of the Swedish government. Lamm was described as a staunch anti-Communist who admired some of the positive features of the United States economy. During World War II, while required to travel to Nazi Germany to carry out ASEA business, Lamm was criticized by his supervisors for his anti-Nazi attitude, such as refusing to give the Nazi Party salute at patent hearings.

Lamm's Ph.D. thesis was titled "The Transductor, DC Pre-Saturated Reactor". While describing this device at a lecture in the United States he also mentioned that the same principle could be applied to resistors, making a transistor. This was the name later applied to the solid-state amplifier.

== Personal life ==
Lamm was married twice and had four children. He died on June 1, 1989, aged 85, in Burlingame, California.

== Awards ==
Lamm's achievements won him a number of professional awards:

- Gold Medal of the Royal Swedish Academy of Engineering Science in 1939
- Polhem Prize by Swedish Association of Graduate Engineers in 1940
- Arnberg Award of the Royal Swedish Academy of Science in 1947
- Gold Medal of the Swedish Society of Inventors in 1961
- John Ericsson Award from the American Society of Swedish Engineers in 1962
- IEEE Lamme Medal from the American Institute of Electrical Engineers (AIEE) in 1965.
- Howard N. Potts Medal from the Franklin Institute in 1981
