= Nanqiao, Shanghai =

Nanqiao 南桥镇
- Town
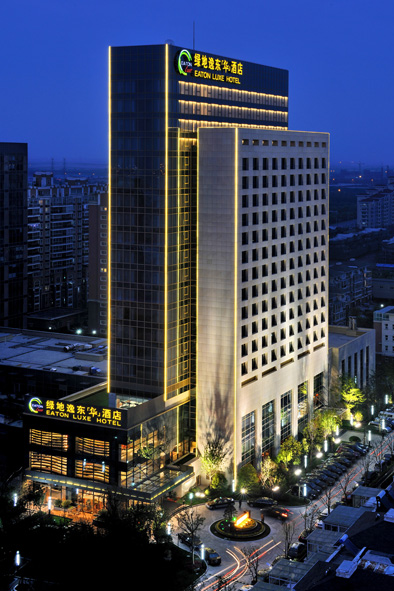
- Eaton Luxe Hotel in Nanqiao

- Location of Nanqiao Nanqiao (China)
- Coordinates: 30°55′00″N 121°27′17″E
- Country: People's Republic of China
- Municipality: Shanghai
- District: Fengxian

Area
  - Total: 73.55 km^{2} (28.40 sq mi)

Population (2010)
  - Total: 361,185
  - Density: 4,911/km^{2} (12,720/sq mi)
- Time zone: UTC+8 (China Standard)

Nanqiao (simplified Chinese: 南桥; traditional Chinese: 南橋; pinyin: Nánqiáo) is a town in Fengxian District, Shanghai.

In the courtyard of Cao's family in Nanqiao, there is a plum that was planted in the Tongzhi period. This plum may have been planted by concubine Cao Zongnai. In 1996, the Fengxian South Bridge began to renovate the old town, and this Lamei was included in the scope of relocation. Under the joint appeal of Cao's family, deputies to the National People's Congress, and members of the CPPCC, the government designated a 100-square-meter area around Lamei as a protected area. The Shanghai Municipal Afforestation Administration listed it as the most ancient and famous tree in Shanghai, known as "the first plum in the south of the Yangtze River", and set up a "protection plate of ancient and famous trees" in the local area.
