= Jindo–Jeju HVDC system =

HVDC submarine cable in South Korea

Location
- Country: Korea
- Coordinates: 34°23′08″N 126°28′24″E; 33°27′17″N 126°11′15″E
- From: Jindo
- To: Jeju Island

Ownership information
- Owner: Korea Electric Power Corporation

Construction information
- Cable manufacturer: LS Cable and System
- Substation manufacturer: Alstom Grid
- Commissioned: 2014

Technical information
- Type: Transmission
- Current type: HVDC
- Total length: 105 km (65 mi)
- Capacity: 400 MW
- DC voltage: ±250 kV
- No. of poles: 2

The Jindo–Jeju HVDC system is a 105 km HVDC submarine cable connection in South Korea between the island of Jindo, close to the Korean Peninsula, and the more distant island of Jeju. The system has a capacity of 400 MW and transmission voltage of ±250 kV and was put into service in 2014. It is the second HVDC link to Jeju Island, after the Haenam–Cheju link completed in the late 1990s (the spelling of the island’s name was changed from Cheju to Jeju in 2000).

The Jindo–Jeju HVDC system is owned and operated by Korea Electric Power Corporation (KEPCO). The cables were designed and built by LS Cable and System and the converter stations were designed and built by Alstom Grid.

The scheme is bipolar but unlike the Haenam–Cheju connection, which used a relatively conventional arrangement with two high-voltage cables and a sea return, Jindo–Jeju HVDC system uses metallic return with a total of four cables: three high-voltage cables and one medium-voltage cable. The high-voltage cables use mass-impregnated paper as the insulation material while the medium-voltage cable uses Cross-linked polyethylene (XLPE) insulation.

Two of the high-voltage cables are normally used as the respective high-voltage conductors for the two converter poles and the medium-voltage cable is normally used as the neutral return conductor, but the third high-voltage cable is capable of being connected in parallel with, or instead of, any of the other three cables, giving a large number of possible operating modes.

The converter stations use Line-Commutated Converters with a conventional arrangement of a single Twelve-pulse bridge per pole.

== Sites ==
Site	Coordinates
Jindo converter station	34°23′08″N 126°28′24″E
Jeju converter station	33°27′17″N 126°11′15″E

== See also ==
- HVDC Haenam–Cheju
