= Châteauguay HVDC-back-to-back station =

Coordinates: 45°15′11″N 73°52′10″W

Châteauguay HVDC-back-to-back station is the largest high-voltage direct current (HVDC) back-to-back converter station in North America. Situated near Châteauguay, on the South Shore of Montreal, Quebec, it is an important plant for power exchange between Hydro-Québec and New York Power Authority (NYPA).

== Capacity ==
The station, which was built by Brown, Boveri & Cie and Siemens in 1983/84, can transfer a maximum power of 1000 megawatts (MW) at a direct current (DC) voltage of 140 kilovolts (kV). The facility, which consists of two 500 MW units is fed from Hydro-Quebec with a 315 kV line and from NYPA with a 120 kV line.

In 2009, its control system is planned to be modernized.

== See also ==
- Hydro-Québec's electricity transmission system
