= Rivera HVDC Back-to-back station =

HVDC back-to-back station in Uruguay

Rivera HVDC Back-to-back station is the first HVDC Back-to-back station situated south of Rivera, Uruguay at 30°56′29″S 55°33′34″W. It was built by Areva and inaugurated in 2000. Rivera HVDC Back-to-back station whose function is to perform a conversion of 50 Hz power from the power grid of Uruguay into 60 Hz for the power grid of Brazil, operates with a DC voltage of 20 kV. The transmission rate is 70 MW. Rivera HVDC Back-to-back station is connected with the power grid of Uruguay by a short single-circuit 150 kV line to Rivera substation situated at 30°56′39″S 55°33′9″W. The connection to the power grid of Brazil is done by a single-circuit 230 kV AC line, which crosses the border between Uruguay and Brazil at 30°52′17″S 55°33′30″W and ends at Livramento Substation 30°51′44″S 55°32′34″W. As this interconnection does not fit today's requirement, a second interconnection over Melo HVDC Back-to-back station was built.

== See also ==
- Back-to-back connection
