= Virginia Smith Converter Station =

Electrical substation in Nebraska

Coordinates: 41°09′51″N 102°59′15″W

Virginia Smith Converter Station is a high-voltage direct current (HVDC) back-to-back converter station near Sidney, Nebraska. Completed in 1988, it is significant for being the first interchange between eastern and western United States electrical grids. The station can transfer a maximum power of 200 megawatts and the voltage used is 55.5 kV.

The facility was named for former Congresswoman Virginia Smith, a Nebraska Republican who represented Nebraska's 3rd congressional district from 1975 to 1991. Virginia Smith Converter Station was built by Siemens. A plaque commemorating the achievement is located in the atrium of the Western Area Power Administration headquarters building in Lakewood, Colorado.

Timing differences in continental-sized nations make national power grids based solely on conventional alternating current impossible. However, power can be transferred over longer distances and between separate AC grids by conversion to direct current during transmission, and conversion to alternating current in phase with the local line frequency at the delivery point. By the early 21st century, high-power semiconductors began to make the more difficult DC-to-AC conversion technically and economically possible at the high power levels needed in power grids.
