= Eastern Alberta Transmission Line =

Eastern Alberta Transmission Line is a 485 km long, 500 kV, bipolar, high-voltage direct current, overhead transmission line interconnecting the Newell HVDC static inverter plant near Brooks, Alberta, with Heathfield static inverter plant near Gibbons, Alberta, northeast of Edmonton.

The transmission line includes 1387 transmission towers and the construction of the 500kV DC transmission line has been completed since December 2014 at a total cost of C$1.8 billion. Work continues on the EATL converter stations. The project is the first newly built, long-distance, HVDC line in Canada since the completion of the Quebec – New England Transmission Project, and is owned by ATCO Electric, being built by Siemens. See also Western Alberta Transmission Line (WATL).

Eastern Alberta Transmission Line is used as Western Alberta Transmission Line in opposite to other HVDC schemes such as Nelson River Bipole an insulated, metallic conductor for the neutral pole, in order to avoid any risk of electrochemical corrosion of oil and gas pipelines.
