= Welsh HVDC Converter Station =

Electrical installation in Texas

Coordinates: 33.0583°N 94.8441°W

Welsh HVDC Converter Station is an HVDC back-to-back station connected between the J. Robert Welsh Power Plant and the Oncor Electric Delivery substation at the Monticello Steam Electric Station in Titus County, northeastern Texas. It went in service in 1995 and it can transfer a maximum power of 600 megawatts. It was built for AEP Southwestern Electric Power Company (SWEPCO) in 1995 by Siemens and operates at 170 kV DC. It is tied to the 345 kV 60 Hz AC grids of the ERCOT and SPP. ERCOT documents refer to this link as the "East DC Tie". It uses electrically triggered thyristors, each with a rating of 5.5 kV.
