= Madawaska HVDC =

The Madawaska HVDC link between the Canadian provinces of Quebec and New Brunswick is located in Quebec near the village of Degelis at 47°30′31″N 68°31′25″W with a connection into New Brunswick near the city of Edmundston. This 350 MW thyristor valve back-to-back HVDC station (with a winter overload rating of 435 MW) was completed in 1985 and connects the 315 kV Quebec transmission system with the 345 kV system in New Brunswick.

Madawaska was built by General Electric and is based on their earlier design of the world's first fully thyristor valve link, the 320 MW Eel River back-to-back HVDC station near Dalhousie, NB. However, instead of using synchronous condensers for voltage control and reactive power supply to the thyristors, Madawaska uses switched filter and shunt reactor banks connected to the high voltage busses on each side. In 2017, Madawaska was upgraded.
