= HVDC Haenam–Cheju =

HVDC connection in South Korea

Haenam–Cheju HVDC system

Location
- Country: Korea
- Coordinates: 34°22′03″N 126°35′34″E; 33°32′06″N 126°35′44″E
- From: Haenam
- To: Jeju Island

Ownership information
- Owner: Korea Electric Power Corporation

Construction information
- Substation manufacturer: Alstom
- Commissioned: 1996; 30 years ago

Technical information
- Type: Transmission
- Current type: HVDC
- Total length: 101 km (63 mi)
- Capacity: 300 MW
- DC voltage: ±180 kV
- No. of poles: 2

The HVDC Haenam–Cheju is a 101 kilometer long HVDC submarine cable connection between the Korean Peninsula and the island of Jeju (spelled Cheju until 2000) in South Korea, which went into service in 1996. The connection is bipolar, consisting of two 180kV cables with a maximum transmission power of 300 megawatts.

The Haenam–Cheju HVDC system is owned and operated by Korea Electric Power Corporation (KEPCO).

The line runs from the Haenam converter station situated at 34°22′03″N 126°35′34″E to Jeju converter station at 33°32′06″N 126°35′44″E and has no overhead line sections. The first 5 kilometres on Korean Mainland are underground, the rest of the cable is laid partially buried in the sea. As the converter station on Jeju is close to the sea, all equipment (even the AC harmonic filters) is installed indoors in order to prevent corrosion and pollution-related flashovers from sea salt.

The system is designed to take over the full power supply of Jeju and is therefore equipped with synchronous compensators delivering the required reactive power and commutation voltage when there is no generation unit at Jeju in operation. These synchronous compensators can be started with gas turbines, which allows starting and subsequently running the HVDC transmission scheme when there is no generation available on the island.

The HVDC scheme includes several unusual design features arising from the design objective of using the HVDC link as the sole source of power to Jeju, in which mode it must define the frequency of the island system. For this reason the inverter on Jeju island must be able to control the received power rapidly without reliance on telecommunications to the mainland. As a result, the control characteristics are reversed from the conventional practice, the inverter (Jeju) station controlling current and the rectifier (Haenam) station controlling DC voltage. The thyristor valves are also designed to operate with a minimum power down to zero (compared with the usual minimum of 5-10%).

== See also ==
- Jindo–Jeju HVDC system
- Economy of South Korea
