= Melo HVDC Back-to-back station =

HVDC back-to-back station in Brazil and Uruguay

The Melo HVDC Back-to-back station is the central part of the EHV-interconnection between Uruguay and Brazil, which is only possible by means of a frequency converter, as the frequency of the power grid in Uruguay is 50 Hz and that in Brazil is 60 Hz. The station, which is situated east of Melo, Uruguay, is interconnected by the San Carlos substation with a 283 kilometres long 500 kV line. It is capable of transferring 500 MW, and was built by AREVA in 31 months from 2009 to 2011.

From the Melo station a 128 kilometres long 525 kV powerline, of which 65 km are situated in Uruguay, runs to a newly built 525 kV/230 kV substation close to the Candiota power station, which contains some harmonic filters.

== See also ==
- Rivera HVDC Back-to-back station
