= HVDC Visby–Näs =

HVDC transmission line in Sweden

The HVDC Visby–Näs is a bipolar HVDC electric power transmission system between Visby and a wind power centre near Näs on Gotland, Sweden. The project went into service in 1999. The system operates at 80 kV with a maximum power of 50 megawatts. This HVDC system allows for voltage regulation in the connected AC systems.

Because obtaining a right-of-way for an overhead line is a lengthy and expensive procedure, the 70 kilometer line is constructed as an underground cable. Since an alternating current three-phase underground cable would have been more expensive, the HVDC system was selected for this project.

== Sites ==
Site	Coordinates
Nas Static Inverter Plant	57°05′58″N 18°14′27″E
Visby Static Inverter Plant	57°37′29″N 18°21′18″E
