= Nexans =

French copper and optical fibre cable company

Nexans S.A.
- Type: Société Anonyme
- Traded as: Euronext: NEX; CAC Next 20
- ISIN: FR0000044448
- Industry: Manufacturing, technology
- Founded: 2000
- Headquarters: Paris, France
- Key people: Julien Hueber, CEO
- Products: Power and data cables for building & territories, high voltage, data and telecoms, renewable energy, oil & gas, automation, transport
- Revenue: ▲€8.54 billion (2024)
- Operating income: ▲€513 million (2024)
- Net income: ▲€283 million (2024)
- Number of employees: >28,500 (average, 2024)
- Website: www.nexans.com

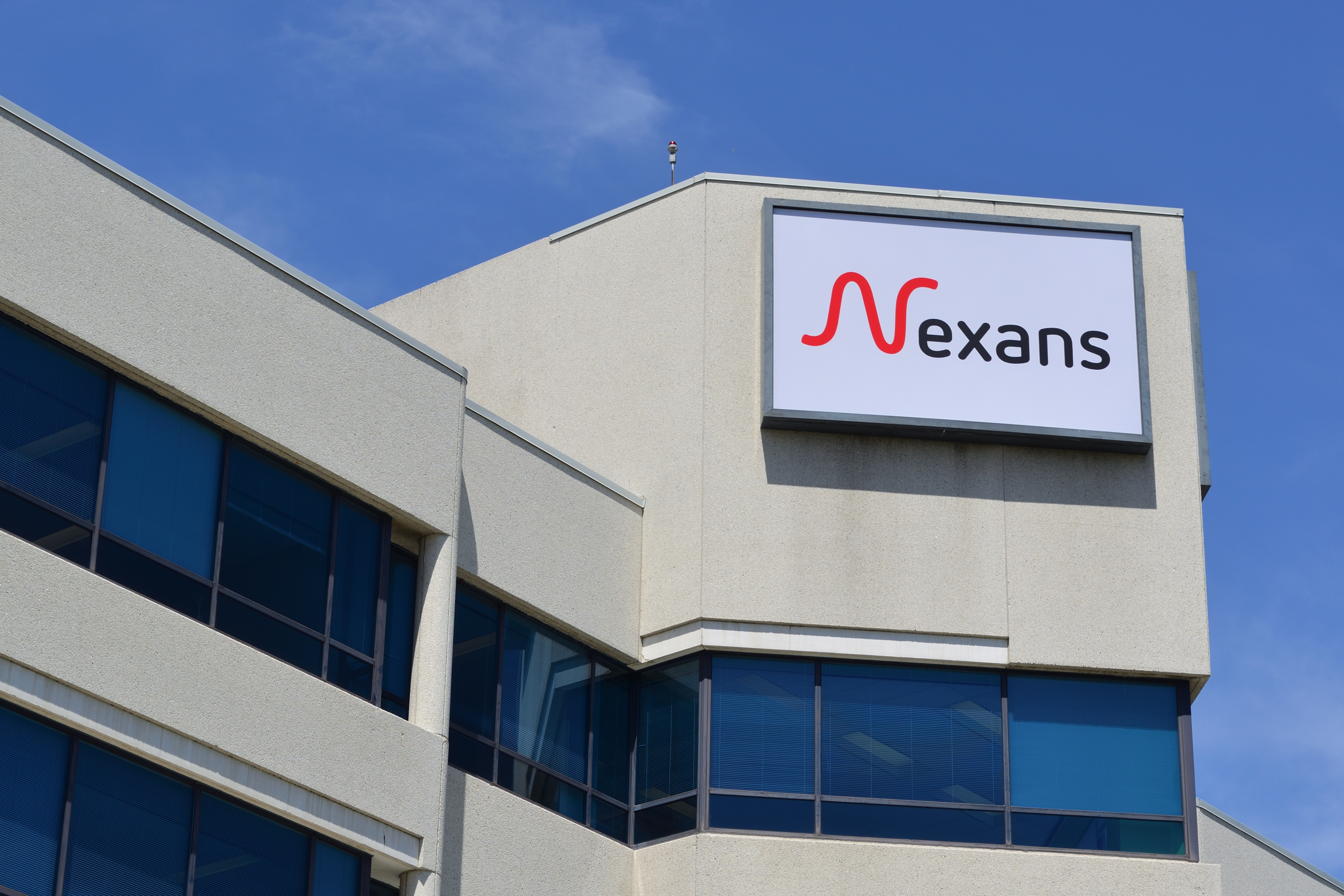
Nexans office in Markham, Ontario, Canada

Nexans S.A. is a global company in the cable and optical fibre industry headquartered in Paris, France.

The group is active in four main business areas: buildings and territories (construction, local infrastructure, smart cities / grids, e-mobility), high voltage and projects (offshore wind farms, subsea interconnections, land high voltage), data and telecoms (telecom networks), data transmission, FTTx, LAN cabling, renewable energies, petroleum, railways and rolling stock, aeronautical and automation.

It is the world's second largest manufacturer of cables after Prysmian S.p.A. In 2017 the Group operated in 34 countries with over 26,000 employees and sales of around €6.4 billion.

== History ==
Nexans was founded in 2000 as a business unit of the telecommunications firm Alcatel after its acquisition of a number of companies in the cable sector. It was spun out and listed on the Paris stock exchange the following year. It is currently listed on Euronext Paris, Compartment A.

In 2012, Nexans completed acquisition of Australian cable maker Olex to become Nexans Olex. Nexans currently operate the Lillydale, Victoria cable manufacturing plant which is Australia's second largest cable production plant after Prysmian's in Liverpool, NSW.

Nexans signed an agreement in 2022 to supply and install HVDC cables for EuroAsia Interconnector, the longest and the deepest HVDC subsea cable project ever, with bi-pole cables of 2x900km.

In 2020 Nexans shut down its Chester, New York factory and exited the US building wire market. In 2021 a new facility was launched in China.
