= Kii Channel HVDC system =

HVDC submarine power cable system in Japan

The Kii Channel HVDC system

The Kii Channel HVDC system in Japan is, as of 2012, the highest-capacity high-voltage direct current (HVDC) submarine power cable system in the world to use a single bipole, with a rated power of 1400MW. The cross channel system between England and France has a larger total capacity, but uses two bipoles rated at 1000MW each.

The Kii Channel HVDC system connects the Anan static inverter plant, located south of Tachibana Power Plant on the Japanese Home Island of Shikoku, with the inverter plant at Kihoku on the largest of the Home Islands, Honshu.

== History ==
The first stage of this project went in service in the year 2000 with a bipolar voltage of 250 kilovolts (kV) and rated to carry 1400 megawatts (MW). A second-stage upgrade to 500kV has been planned from the outset and the HV cable, DC switchgear and DC reactor are already rated for the higher voltage, but as of 2012 the upgrade has not been put into effect.

The project contained several "firsts" when it was originally built, including:

- The Kii Channel HVDC system was the first HVDC project to use Gas-Insulated Switchgear (GIS) on the HVDC side
- The thyristor valves, built by Hitachi, Toshiba and Mitsubishi Electric, used 150mm diameter light triggered thyristors. At the time these were the largest thyristors ever made, and it was another 10 years before thyristors of such large diameter were used again, in the Lingbao 2 and Xiangjiaba – Shanghai HVDC projects in China.

The first 50 kilometers of the transmission line run north from the Anan inverter station as an undersea cable. At Yura, there is a switching station, and from there the HVDC line runs for another 50 km as an overhead power line.
