= HVDC Gotland =

HVDC plant in Sweden

- Map of HVDC Gotland

Location
- Country: Sweden
- To: Gotland

Construction information
- Commissioned: 1954 (Gotland 1); 1983 (Gotland 2); 1987 (Gotland 3)

Technical information
- Capacity: 20MW (Gotland 1); 150MW (Gotland 2); 150MW (Gotland 3)
- DC voltage: 100kV (Gotland 1); 150kV (Gotland 2); 150kV (Gotland 3)

The HVDC Gotland, on the Swedish east coast, was the first fully commercial static plant for high-voltage direct current transmission (HVDC) in the world.

== Gotland 1 ==
The first HVDC Gotland link (Gotland 1) went into service in 1954. It could transfer 20 megawatts over a 98-kilometer-long submarine cable between Västervik on the mainland and Ygne on the island of Gotland, with a voltage of 100 kV. Mercury arc valves were used in the static inverter. The Swedish company ASEA manufactured the connection for Vattenfall, the state-owned energy provider.

In 1970 the service was re-engineered to a transmission capacity of 30 megawatts at a voltage of 150 kV by using the first thyristor module for HVDC applications.

== Gotland 2 ==
However even this capacity was not high enough and in 1983 a new monopolar link, HVDC Gotland 2 with a transmission capacity of 130 MW and a transmission voltage of 150 kV was established. It consists of a 92.9 kilometers long cable with a single copper conductor of 800 mm^{2} cross section, from which 92 kilometres are submarine and 0.9 kilometres underground. Beside this, HVDC Gotland 2 has a 6.6 kilometres long overhead powerline section between Västervik static inverter plant and the Swedish Coast. It has 2 Aluminium conductors each with a cross section of 910 mm^{2}, which are installed on wooden poles - perhaps the only HVDC powerline using such poles.

== Gotland 3 ==
In 1987 HVDC Gotland 3, a further monopolar link, with a transmission capacity of 130 MW and transmission voltage of 150 kV was installed. It consists of a 98 kilometers long cable with a single copper conductor of 800 mm^{2} cross section. 92 kilometres of this cable are laid in the sea and 6 kilometres underground on land.

== Structure ==
The grounding electrode of the Västervik Inverter Station is situated at Almvik on Östra Eknö, that of Ygne Inverter Station at Gravfält. Both electrodes are used for Gotland 2 and Gotland 3 and are situated in sea-water filled basins close to the sea. At Almvik there are 2 such basins, while Gravfält uses only one. The basin design of the electrodes prevents fishes from getting too close to the electrodes, which may harm them. The Almvik electrode is connected with Västervik Inverter Station by an 18.95 kilometres long line with 4 overhead line and 3 submarine cable sections for strait crossings. The overhead line sections, which have a total length of 17 kilometres are installed on wooden poles and consist of 2 Aluminium conductors each with 910 mm^{2} cross section. The total length of the cable sections amounts to 1.95 kilometres and consist of 2 cables each with 1000 mm^{2} cross section. The connection between Ygne Inverter Station and Gravfält Electrode has a length of 12.75 kilometres. It consists of a 12 kilometres long overhead line on wooden poles, which uses 2 Aluminium conductors each with 910 mm^{2} cross section and a 0.75 kilometres long underground cable consisting of 2 Aluminium conductors each with 1000 mm^{2} cross section.

== Sites ==
Site	Coordinates
Västervik HVDC Static Inverter	57°43′41″N 16°38′51″E
Händelöp HVDC Gotland 2 Cable Terminal	57°41′07″N 16°42′47″E
Lilla Nävelsvik Electrode Line Terminal	57°40′57″N 16°38′22″E
Narsvik Overhead Electrode Line Terminal	57°40′41″N 16°38′19″E
Grönvall Overhead Electrode Line Terminal	57°38′54″N 16°37′25″E
Grytsholmen Overhead Electrode Line Terminal	57°38′42″N 16°37′21″E
Hamudden Overhead Electrode Line Terminal	57°36′29″N 16°39′33″E
Västerbofjärden Overhead Electrode Line Terminal	57°36′10″N 16°40′25″E
Almvik Electrodes	57°34′32″N 16°41′49″E ; 57°34′29″N 16°41′50″E
Ygne HVDC Static Inverter	57°35′13″N 18°11′44″E
Gravfält Electrode	57°30′52″N 18°6′35″E

== Waypoints ==
=== Overhead line on the Swedish Mainland ===
- 57.728830°N 16.649292°E
- 57.727991°N 16.651368°E
- 57.721153°N 16.651711°E
- 57.718387°N 16.653712°E
- 57.714237°N 16.654930°E
- 57.711793°N 16.660954°E
- 57.703025°N 16.676401°E
- 57.699976°N 16.680856°E
- 57.694865°N 16.689101°E
- 57.690854°N 16.699723°E
- 57.685483°N 16.713198°E

=== Electrode line on the Swedish Mainland ===
- 57.728787°N 16.647438°E
- 57.728739°N 16.646322°E
- 57.727696°N 16.644273°E
- 57.723468°N 16.640462°E
- 57.719535°N 16.639469°E
- 57.707652°N 16.638836°E
- 57.693538°N 16.635961°E
- 57.682696°N 16.639512°E
- 57.678121°N 16.638686°E
- 57.652599°N 16.625758°E
- 57.648288°N 16.623741°E
- 57.644944°N 16.622427°E
- 57.642119°N 16.621874°E
- 57.623802°N 16.637173°E
- 57.612707°N 16.653471°E
- 57.608089°N 16.659253°E
- 57.602916°N 16.670897°E
- 57.590618°N 16.685947°E
- 57.582124°N 16.688479°E
- 57.580045°N 16.691000°E
- 57.577408°N 16.693216°E
- 57.575285°N 16.696509°E
- 57.602782°N 16.671307°E

=== Electrode line on Gotland ===
- 57.577183°N 18.206276°E
- 57.572359°N 18.203154°E
- 57.549371°N 18.177180°E
- 57.529447°N 18.160883°E
- 57.510034°N 18.129324°E
- 57.513345°N 18.122211°E
- 57.516171°N 18.111793°E

== See also ==
- Uno Lamm
- ASEA
