= HVDC Hokkaido–Honshu =

HVDC transmission line in Japan

HVDC Hokkaidō–Honshū
- Map of HVDC Hokkaidō–Honshū

Location
- Country: Japan
- Coordinates: 41°55′55″N 140°39′47″E; 40°48′06″N 141°11′52″E
- From: Nanae, Hokkaido
- To: Tohoku, Aomori

Ownership information
- Owner: Electric Power Development Company

Construction information
- Commissioned: 1979

Technical information
- Type: overhead line submarine cable
- Current type: HVDC
- Total length: 193 km (120 mi)
- Capacity: 300 MW
- DC voltage: 250 kV

The HVDC Hokkaidō–Honshū or Hokkaidō–Honshū HVDC Link (北海道・本州間電力連系設備, Hokkaidō-Honshū-kan Denryoku Renkei Setsubi), Kitahon HVDC Link (北本連系, Kitahon Renkei) for short, is a 193-kilometre-long (120 mi) high voltage direct current transmission line for the interconnection of the power grids of Hokkaidō (Hakodate static inverter station in Nanae) and Honshū (Kamikita static inverter station in Tohoku, Aomori Prefecture), Japan. The project went into service in 1979 by the Electric Power Development Company (J-POWER). A 149-kilometre-long (93 mi) overhead line and a 44-kilometre-long (27 mi) submarine cable connect the terminals. The HVDC Hokkaidō–Honshū is a monopolar HVDC line with an operating voltage of 250 kV and rated power of 300 megawatts. This HVDC system uses thyristor converters.

In 2019 a second HVDC system between the two islands, with a rated power of 300 MW and using Voltage-Source Converters, was put into operation.

== Sites ==
- Nanae Static Inverter Plant (七飯変換所, Nanae Henkansho) (Hokkaido) 41°55′55″N 140°39′47″E
- Furukawa Cable Terminal (古川ケーブルヘッド, Furukawa Kēburu-heddo) (Hokkaido) 41°45′54″N 140°51′33″E
- Sai Cable Terminal (佐井ケーブルヘッド, Sai Kēburu-heddo) (Honshu) 41°27′54″N 140°53′24″E
- Kamikita Static Inverter Plant (上北変換所, Kamikita Henkansho) (Honshu) 40°48′06″N 141°11′52″E
