= HVDC Zhoushan =

HVDC power line in China

Zhoushan HVDC was the first HVDC scheme built in China and first put into service in July 2014.

Construction started on Zhoushan HVDC in 1984 and completed in 1986. It was built by Heavy Machine Factory, Beijing, Red Flag cable plant and Shanghai Relay Factory.

Zhoushan HVDC went in-service on December 1, 1989.

== Description ==
Zhoushan HVDC is a bipolar HVDC connecting the power grid of Zhoushan island with the rectifier station in Daqi Town, Ningbo. There is a submarine power cable (±200 kV DC) that is 129 kilometers long and a transmission line (200 kV) that is 11 kilometers long. The static inverters are equipped with thyristors and designed for a voltage of 200 kV and a maximum transmission rate of 50 MW.

The inverters are the six-pole type, giving the station more extended harmonic filters than others. As transformers on the mainland a three winding type 115/83/10kV is used and on Zhenshou island a three winding type 38.5±2×2.5%/81/10kV is used. The reactive power of the used harmonics filters is 23.5 MVAr at Ningbo station and 24.5 MVar at Gao Tongge station on Zhoushan. The smoothing reactor has an inductance of 1.27 H.

== Coordinates ==
The inverter plants are:

- Ningbo static inverter plant 29°55′25″N 121°46′51″E
- Gao Tongge static inverter plant 30°02′13″N 122°04′03″E

== See also ==
- Zhoushan Island Overhead Powerline Tie
