= Barkeryd =

Village in Nässjö Municipality, Sweden

Coordinates: 57°43′N 14°35′E

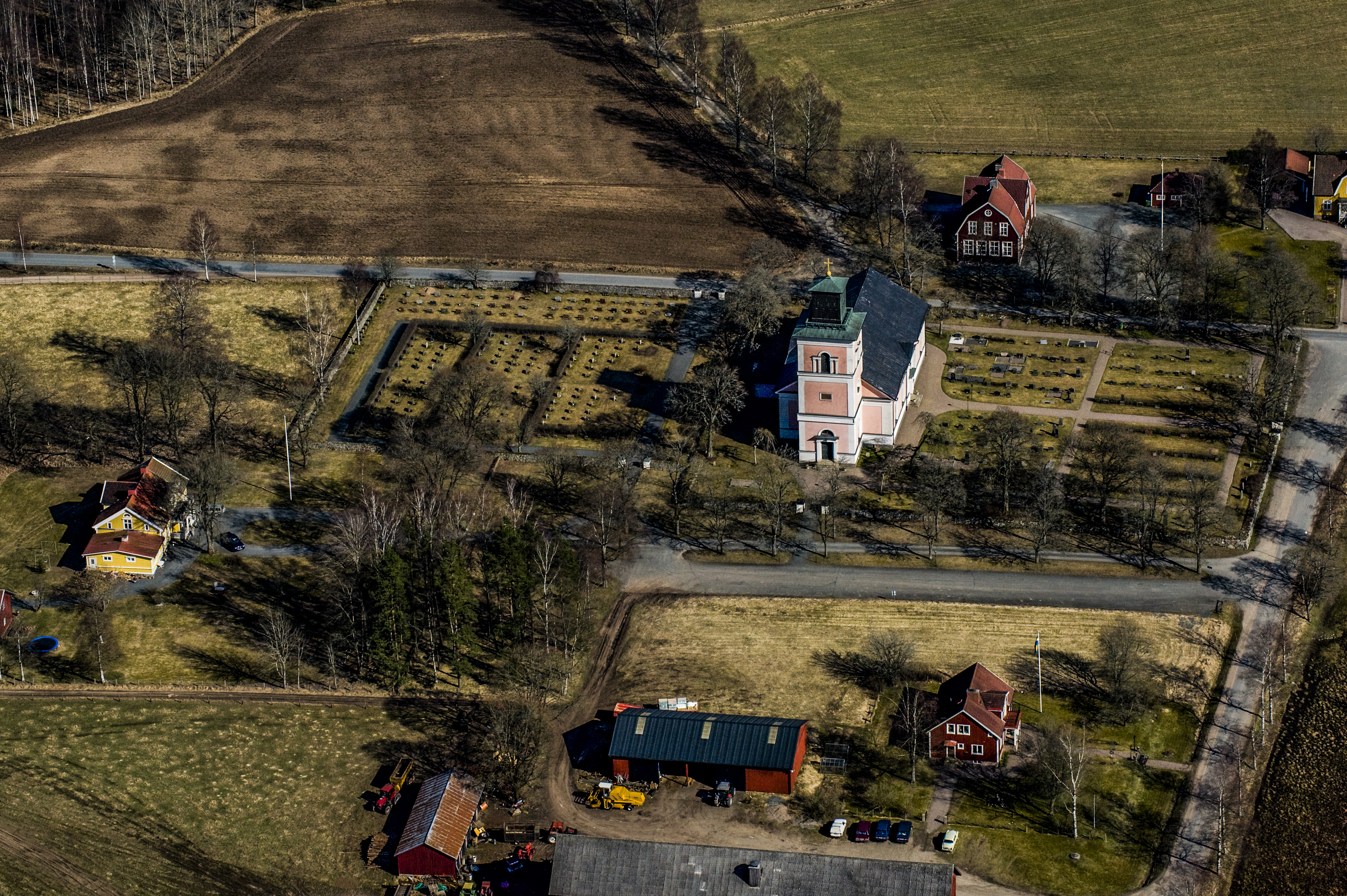
The church and surrounding area in 2009

Barkeryd is a village in Nässjö Municipality, Jönköping County, Sweden. It is the site of a church, Barkeryd Church. The village sees two large traditional yearly events, with the local scout troop organising a midsummer celebration, and the local heritage organisation arranging a yearly community festival which most years attracts up to 1000 visitors. The local scout troop was founded in 1944.
