= Hurva, Sweden =

Hurva
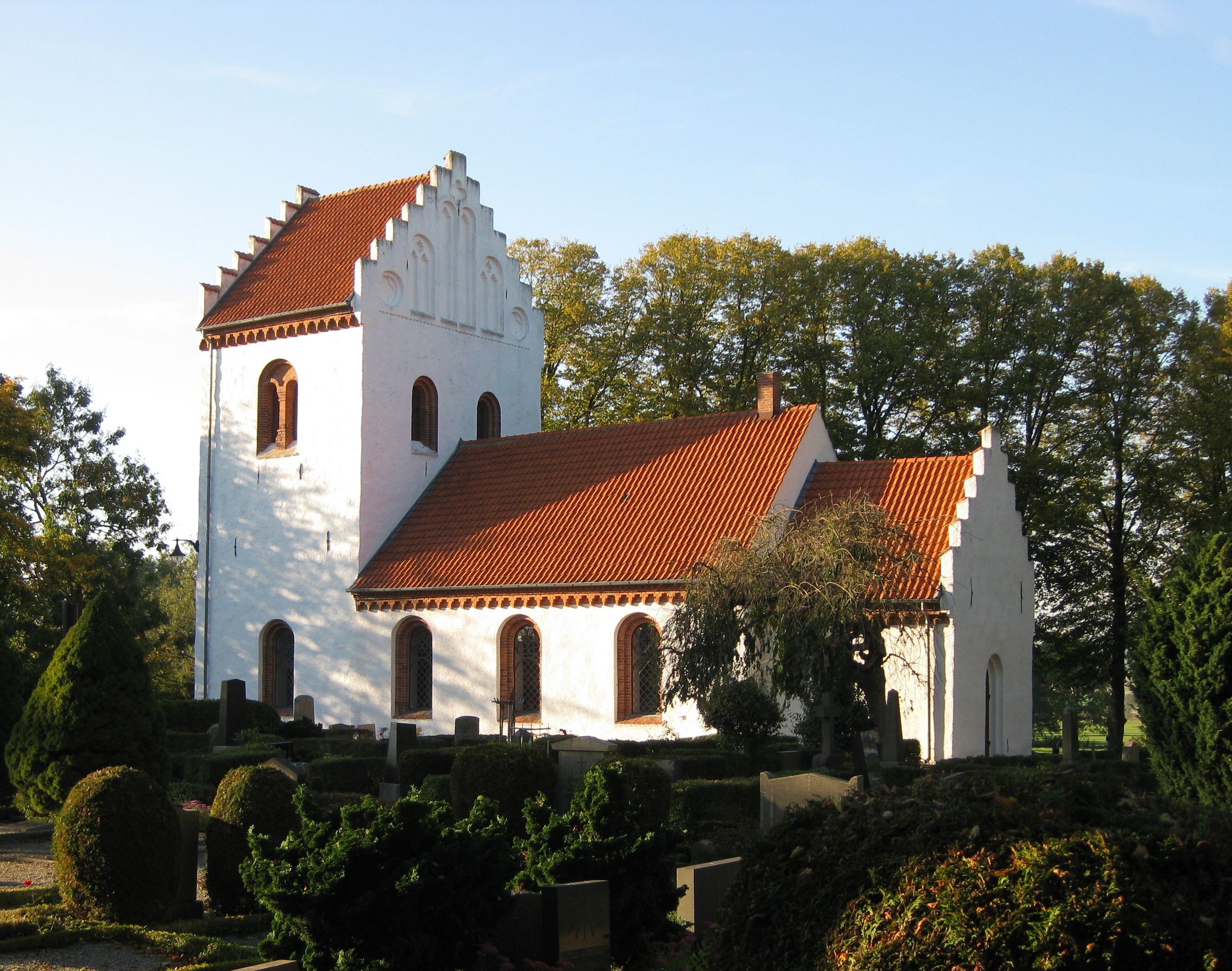
- Hurva Church

- Location within Skåne Location within Sweden
- Coordinates: 55°48′N 13°26′E
- Country: Sweden
- Province: Skåne
- County: Skåne County
- Municipality: Eslöv Municipality

Area
  - Total: 0.55 km^{2} (0.21 sq mi)

Population (31 December 2010)
  - Total: 350
  - Density: 636/km^{2} (1,650/sq mi)
- Time zone: UTC+1 (CET)
  - Summer (DST): UTC+2 (CEST)

Hurva is a locality situated in Eslöv Municipality, Skåne County, Sweden with 350 inhabitants in 2010.
