= 2021 United States ballot measures =

- March 2 to November 13, 2021

Part of the 2021 United States elections

This is a list of referendums from 2021 in the United States.

== By state ==
=== Colorado ===
Origin	Status	Measure	Description (Result of a "yes" vote)	Date	Yes	No
Citizens	Failed	Colorado Amendment 78, Custodial Fund Appropriations Initiative	Amend the state constitution and state law to transfer the power to appropriate custodial funds (certain state revenue not generated through taxes) from the state treasurer to the state legislature and requiring opportunities for public comment during public hearings for appropriations of such funds.	Nov 2	646,983; 43.03%	856,704; 56.97%
Citizens	Failed	Colorado Proposition 119, Creation of Out-of-School Education Program and Marijuana Sales Tax Increase Initiative	Create the Learning Enrichment and Academic Progress Program (LEAP) and increasing the marijuana retail sales tax by 5 percentage points from 15% to 20% to partially fund the program.	Nov 2	701,479; 45.75%	831,670; 54.25%
Citizens	Failed	Colorado Proposition 120, Reduce Property Tax Rates and Retain $25 Million in TABOR Surplus Revenue Initiative	Reduce the residential property tax assessment rate from 7.15% to 6.5% and the non-residential property tax assessment rate from 29% to 26.4%; and authorize the state to retain and spend $25 million in revenue above the state's TABOR spending cap for five years, which it would otherwise be required to refund to taxpayers, to fund reimbursements to local government entities for lost revenue due to homestead exemptions given to qualifying seniors and disabled veterans.	Nov 2	652,382; 42.96%	866,197; 57.04%

=== Louisiana ===
Origin	Status	Measure	Description (Result of a "yes" vote)	Date	Yes	No
Legislature	Failed	Louisiana Amendment 1, Creation of the State and Local Streamlined Sales and Use Tax Commission Measure	Create the State and Local Streamlined Sales and Use Tax Commission tasked to provide streamlined electronic filing and remittance of all sales and use taxes.	Nov 13	199,285; 48.17%	214,429; 51.83%
Legislature	Approved	Louisiana Amendment 2, Reduction of the Maximum Individual Income Tax Rate Measure	Amend the state constitution to decrease the maximum allowable individual income tax rate from 6% to 4.75% for tax years beginning in 2022 and providing in state law through House Bill 278 that the tax bracket rates beginning in 2022 for an individual would be 1.75% on the first $12,500 of net income; 3.50% on the next net income up to $50,000; and 4.25% on income above $50,000.	Nov 13	223,263; 54.03%	189,970; 45.97%
Legislature	Failed	Louisiana Amendment 3, Authorize Certain Levee Districts to Collect a Five-Mill Annual Property Tax Measure	Allow Louisiana levee districts created after 2006 to levy an annual property tax of up to five mills ($5 per $1,000 of assessed value) without voter approval if those districts approve the 2021 constitutional amendment. In districts that did not approve the amendment, voter approval would have continued to be required to levy a property tax.	Nov 13	172,542; 42.07%	237,600; 57.93%
Legislature	Failed	Louisiana Amendment 4, Increase Limit on Funding Reductions and Redirections During Budget Deficits Measure	Increase the amount of funds (from 5% to 10%) that can be redirected to a purpose other than what was originally provided for by law or as stated in the constitution during a projected budget deficit.	Nov 13	112,927; 27.73%	294,370; 72.27%

=== Maine ===
Origin	Status	Measure	Description (Result of a "yes" vote)	Date	Yes	No
Citizens	Approved	Maine Question 1	Prohibit the construction of electric transmission lines defined as high-impact in the Upper Kennebec Region, including the NECEC, and require a two-thirds vote of each state legislative chamber to approve high-impact electric transmission line projects.	Nov 2	243,943; 59.20%	168,143; 40.80%
Legislature	Approved	Maine Question 2, Transportation Infrastructure Bond Issue	Provide for $100 million in general obligation bonds for transportation infrastructure projects, with $85 million for highways and bridges and $15 million for rail, aviation, ports, and active transportation.	Nov 2	296,478; 71.97%	115,481; 28.03%
Legislature	Approved	Maine Question 3	Create a state right to growing, raising, harvesting, and producing food, as long as an individual does not commit trespassing, theft, poaching, or abuses to private land, public land, or natural resources.	Nov 2	249,273; 60.84%	160,440; 39.16%

=== New Jersey ===
Origin	Status	Measure	Description (Result of a "yes" vote)	Date	Yes	No
Legislature	Failed	New Jersey Public Question 1, Sports Betting on State College Athletics Amendment	Establish constitutional amendment to allow wagering on college sport competitions.	Nov 2	909,467; 42.99%	1,206,011; 57.01%
Legislature	Approved	New Jersey Public Question 2, Raffle Money for Organizations Amendment	Allow organizations that are permitted to hold raffles to keep the raffle proceeds to support themselves.	Nov 2	1,335,543; 64.12	747,499; 35.88%

=== New York ===
Origin	Status	Measure	Description (Result of a "yes" vote)	Date	Yes	No
Legislature	Failed	New York Proposal 1	Change the vote thresholds for adopting redistricting plans when one political party controls both legislative chambers; require that incarcerated persons be counted at the place of their last residence for redistricting; require the state to count residents, including people who are residents but not citizens, should the federal census fail to do so; remove the block-on-border requirement for Senate districts; cap the number of state senators at 63; and move up the timeline for redistricting and repeal inoperative language.	Nov 2	1,361,043; 45.62%	1,622,195; 54.38%
Legislature	Approved	New York Proposal 2	Add a right to clean water, clean air, and a healthful environment to the New York Constitution's Bill of Rights.	Nov 2	2,129,051; 70.12%	907,159; 29.88%
Legislature	Failed	New York Proposal 3	Remove the requirement that persons must register to vote at least ten days before an election, thus authorizing the state legislature to pass a statute for a requirement of less than 10 days, such as same-day voter registration.	Nov 2	1,336,327; 43.70%	1,721,811; 56.30%
Legislature	Failed	New York Proposal 4	Authorize the state legislature to pass a statute for no-excuse absentee voting.	Nov 2	1,370,897; 44.97%	1,677,580; 55.03%
Legislature	Approved	New York Proposal 5	Allow the New York City Civil Court to hear and decide lawsuits involving claims of $50,000, rather than the current threshold of $25,000.	Nov 2	1,874,515; 64.06%	1,051,803; 35.94%

=== Pennsylvania ===
Origin	Status	Measure	Description (Result of a "yes" vote)	Date	Yes	No
Legislature	Approved	Pennsylvania Question 1, Legislative Resolution to Extend or Terminate Emergency Declaration Amendment	Establish a constitutional amendment to allow the Pennsylvania General Assembly to pass a resolution, which the governor cannot veto, by a simple majority to extend or terminate the governor's emergency declaration.	May 18	1,165,851; 52.05%	1,074,205; 47.95%
Legislature	Approved	Pennsylvania Question 2, Emergency Declarations Amendment	Establish a constitutional amendment to limit the governor's emergency declaration to 21 days unless the legislature votes on a concurrent resolution to extend the order and provide that the state legislature shall pass laws related to how disaster emergencies must be managed.	May 18	1,174,528; 51.97%	1,085,371; 48.03%
Legislature	Approved	Pennsylvania Question 3	Add language to the state constitution that prohibits the denial or abridgement of rights on account of an individual's race or ethnicity.	May 18	1,629,889; 72.31%	624,205; 27.69%
Legislature	Approved	Pennsylvania Question 4, Municipal Fire and EMS Services Loans Measure	Expand the state's loan program for volunteer fire companies and ambulance services to also include municipal fire companies and EMS services.	May 18	1,629,773; 72.89%	606,147; 27.11%

=== Rhode Island ===
Origin	Status	Measure	Description (Result of a "yes" vote)	Date	Yes	No
Bond Issue	Approved	Rhode Island Question 1, Higher Education Bond Measure	Authorize the state to issue at least $107.3 million in bonds for the University of Rhode Island Fine Arts Center, the Rhode Island College Clarke Science Building, and the Community College of Rhode Island.	Mar 2	62,881; 59.39%	43,006; 40.61%
Bond Issue	Approved	Rhode Island Question 2, State Beaches and Water Bond Measure	Authorize the state to issue bonds in an amount not to exceed $74 million for state beaches, parks, recreational facilities, and water projects.	Mar 2	82,696; 78.32%	22,893; 21.68%
Bond Issue	Approved	Rhode Island Question 3, Housing Bond Measure	Authorize the state to issue bonds in an amount not to exceed $65 million for building and renovation projects, including projects affordable to households with income below a certain level.	Mar 2	69,318; 66.03%	35,654; 33.97%
Bond Issue	Approved	Rhode Island Question 4, Transportation Bond Measure	Authorize the state to issue bonds in an amount not to exceed $71.7 million for transportation infrastructure.	Mar 2	85,369; 80.67%	20,460; 19.33%
Bond Issue	Approved	Rhode Island Question 5, Early Childhood Care and Education Capital Fund Bond Measure	Authorize the state to issue bonds in an amount not to exceed $15 million for the Early Childhood Care and Education Capital Fund.	Mar 2	70,676; 66.80%	35,133; 33.20%
Bond Issue	Approved	Rhode Island Question 6, Cultural Arts and State Preservation Grant Programs Bond Measure	Authorize the state to issue bonds in an amount not to exceed $7 million for the Cultural Arts and the Economy Grant Program and the State Preservation Grants Program.	Mar 2	64,098; 60.67%	41,555; 39.33%
Bond Issue	Approved	Rhode Island Question 7, Improvements to Industrial Facilities Infrastructure Bond Measure	Authorize the state to issue bonds in an amount not to exceed $60 million to fund improvements to industrial facilities infrastructure.	Mar 2	62,085; 58.91%	43,306; 41.09%

=== Texas ===
Origin	Status	Measure	Description (Result of a "yes" vote)	Date	Yes	No
Legislature	Approved	Proposition 1	Amend the state constitution to authorize professional sports team charitable foundations to conduct raffles at rodeo venues and include professional association-sanctioned rodeos in the definition of professional sports team.	Nov 2	1,242,625; 83.82%	239,783; 16.18%
Legislature	Approved	Proposition 2	Amend the state constitution to authorize counties to issue bonds to fund transportation and infrastructure projects in blighted areas; prohibit counties from allocating more than 65% of property tax revenue increases annually to repay the bonds; and prohibit counties from using the funds from the issuance of the bonds to build a toll road.	Nov 2	931,453; 63.09%	544,834; 36.91%
Legislature	Approved	Proposition 3	Amend the state constitution to prohibit the state or any political subdivision from enacting a law, rule, order, or proclamation that limits religious services or organizations.	Nov 2	925,447; 62.42%	557,093; 37.58%
Legislature	Approved	Proposition 4	Require a justice of the Supreme Court, a judge of the Court of Criminal Appeals, a justice of a Court of Appeals, and a district judge to be residents of Texas as well as citizens of the United States; have 10 years of experience in Texas as a practicing lawyer or judge of a state or county court for candidates of the supreme court, Texas Court of Criminal Appeals, or a court of appeals; require eight years of experience in Texas as a practicing lawyer or judge of a state or county court for candidates of a district court; disqualify candidates if their license to practice law was revoked or suspended during experience requirement; and applies these requirements to individuals elected or appointed to a term beginning after January 1, 2025.	Nov 2	845,030; 58.78%	592,585; 41.22%
Legislature	Approved	Proposition 5	Add a provision to the state constitution that authorizes the State Commission on Judicial Conduct to investigate and discipline candidates seeking state judicial office in the same manner as judicial officeholders.	Nov 2	852,336; 59.23%	586,686; 40.77%
Legislature	Approved	Proposition 6	Amend the state constitution to establish a right for residents of nursing or assisted living facilities to designate an essential caregiver, who cannot be prohibited from in-person visitation.	Nov 2	1,293,922; 87.87%	178,665; 12.13%
Legislature	Approved	Proposition 7	Amend the state constitution to allow the surviving spouse of a disabled individual to maintain a homestead property tax limit if the spouse is 55 years of age or older at the time of the death and remains at the homestead.	Nov 2	1,285,384; 87.12%	190,109; 12.18%
Legislature	Approved	Proposition 8	Amend the state constitution to allow the legislature to provide a homestead property tax exemption for the surviving spouse of a military member "killed or fatally injured in the line of duty."	Nov 2	1,291,920; 87.76%	180,179; 12.24%

=== Washington ===
Origin	Status	Measure	Description (Result of a "yes" vote)	Date	Yes	No
Advisory Question	Failed	Washington Advisory Vote 36, Nonbinding Question on Telephone Tax to Fund Behavioral Health Crisis Response and Suicide Prevention	Advise the legislature to maintain a tax on to be collected on every telephone line and prepaid wireless retail transaction as well as VOIP (voice over internet protocol) providers with revenue allocated to behavioral health and suicide prevention services, including national 988 hotline services. The tax was passed in House Bill 1477 (2021).	Nov 2	834,818; 46.11%	975,602; 53.89%
Advisory Question	Failed	Washington Advisory Vote 37, Nonbinding Question on Capital Gains Tax to Fund Education and Child Care	Advise the legislature to maintain a 7% tax on capital gains above $250,000 with revenue allocated to education and child services, which was passed in Senate Bill 5096 (2021).	Nov 2	707,354; 38.95%	1,108,531; 61.05%
Advisory Question	Failed	Washington Advisory Vote 38, Nonbinding Question on Captive Insurers Tax	Advise the legislature to maintain a 2% tax on the premiums of captive insurers, which was passed in Senate Bill 5315 (2021). Captive insurers are owned by the entities they insure.	Nov 2	761,093; 42.85%	1,015,197; 57.15%
