= 2021 Maine referendums =

Two referendum questions were placed on the statewide ballot in Maine for November 2, 2021. One was a citizen-initiated proposal, while the other was a proposed amendment to the Maine Constitution submitted by the Maine Legislature for ratification.

- Limits on power line construction: This proposal sought to stop the construction of the Hydro Québec's New England Clean Energy Connect (NECEC) power line between Quebec and Massachusetts by retroactively revoking its approval and banning such construction in the upper Kennebec River region. It also would require that the Legislature approve the construction of other power lines elsewhere in Maine, including by a 2/3 vote if such construction will occur on public land. The referendum question was approved about 59%-41%, with 92% of precincts reporting. The referendum ultimately failed in its goal to block construction of the Clean Energy Connect, as state and federal legal action allowed construction to resume.
- Food sovereignty amendment: This proposed constitutional amendment would declare that individuals have a "natural, inherent, and unalienable right to grow, raise, harvest, produce, and consume the food of their own choosing for their own nourishment, sustenance, bodily health, and well-being". The question was also approved with a 60–40 margin.
