= New York Proposal 1 =

New York Proposal 1 could refer to:

- 2021 New York Proposal 1 - Redistricting reform (rejected)
- 2024 New York Proposal 1 - LGBTQ and abortion rights in state constitution (approved)
- 2025 New York Proposal 1
