= Saint Lawrence River HVDC Powerline Crossing =

Coordinates: 46°36′21.8″N 71°59′20.8″W

The Saint Lawrence River HVDC Powerline Crossing is the crossing of Hydro-Québec's Quebec-New England HVDC transmission line under the Saint Lawrence River between Grondines and Lotbinière, Quebec, Canada. The crossing is remarkable for being first implemented as an overhead crossing and later replaced by a cable tunnel. Hydro-Québec wanted to complete the transmission line in time, which was only possible with an overhead crossing of the Saint Lawrence River. However, due to the negative visual impact of the large towers of the overhead crossing on the local populations of Grondines and Lotbinière, it was decided to build a cable tunnel under the river, although this made the project more expensive.

== Overhead crossing construction ==
In 1988 construction work for three artificial islands in the Saint Lawrence River, which were connected with jetties to the mainland as construction for the pylons of the overhead crossing started. Between July 1988 and spring 1989, 20,000 truck loads of 400,000 tonnes (390,000 long tons; 440,000 short tons) were transported. In 1989 the towers of the temporary overhead line crossing were erected. The suspension pylons on each side of the waterway were 140 meters (459 ft) tall to ensure the required clearance. Building these towers required five months construction time and approximately 40 specially trained workers. At the end of 1989 the overhead crossing, which consisted of five towers, was completed. After the tunnel was completed the overhead line and pylons used for it were dismantled. One of the pylons would later be used for the construction of the La Cité de l'Énergie observation tower.

== Underground crossing construction ==
In spring 1989 work on the 3,954 metres (12,972 ft) long cable tunnel started, which took six months of drilling in two 12-hour shifts. The average drilling rate was 27 metres (89 ft) a day, but achieved in horizontal sections over 90 metres (300 ft) a day. On March 26, 1990, the tunnel boring machine reached the surface 8 centimetres (3.1 in) away from its target point. Later the tunnel was covered with concrete, and troughs for the cable support were installed. On November 1, 1990, the underground HVDC transmission line went in service with a transmission rate of 1200 MW, which was increased to 2250 MW on July 1, 1991.

In 1992 the overhead line over the Saint Lawrence River, including the artificial islands and the jetties were dismantled. Portions of one of these towers would later be used as part of the observation tower at La Cité de l'Énergie in Shawinigan. The costs for dismantling was CA$16 million.

== See also ==
- Hydro-Québec's electricity transmission system
- Quebec - New England Transmission
