= SAPEI =

Undersea power transmission line from the Italian mainland to Sardinia

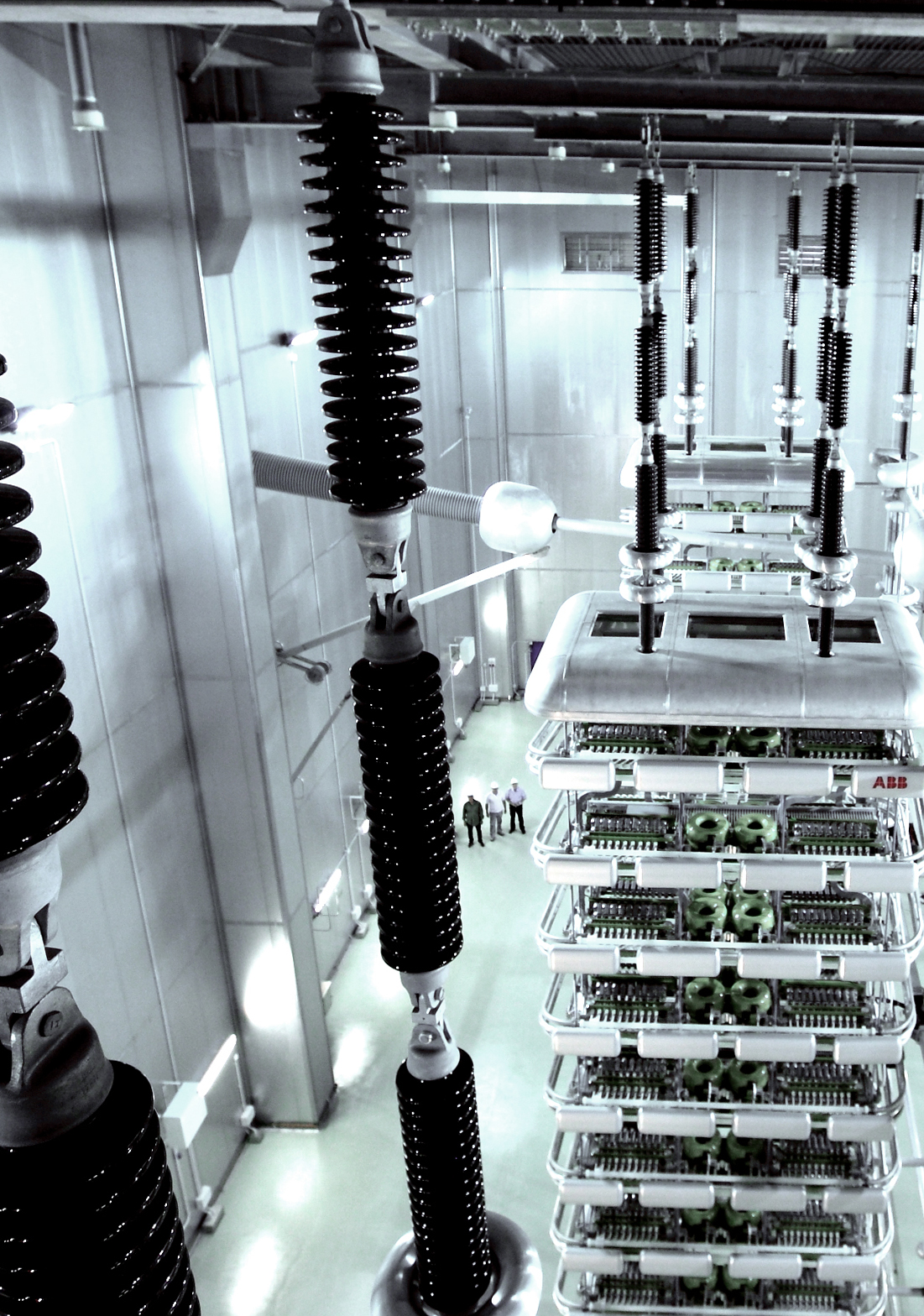
- SAPEI's HVDC converters in Latina
- Location of SAPEI

Location
- Country: Italy
- Coordinates: 40°50′29″N 8°18′21″E; 41°25′47″N 12°48′25″E
- From: Fiume Santo
- Passes through: Tyrrhenian Sea
- To: Latina

Ownership information
- Operator: Terna

Construction information
- Cable manufacturer: Prysmian
- Substation manufacturer: ABB
- Commissioned: 2010

Technical information
- Type: submarine cables
- Current type: HVDC
- Total length: 435 km (270 mi)
- Capacity: 1000 MW
- AC voltage: 400 kV
- DC voltage: 500 kV
- No. of poles: 2

SAPEI, is a high-voltage direct current power transmission system that connects Sardinia with the Italian mainland. The submarine cable from Fiume Santo to Latina runs at 1,600 metres (5,200 ft) below sea level in the Tyrrhenian Sea. It is the deepest submarine power cable in the world. The cable is owned and operated by Terna.

== History ==
The project was launched in 2006. Scientific surveys and studies of the sea floor began soon after. The first submarine cable as also onshore cables was laid in 2008 and the first voltage tests were conducted. In 2009, the converter stations in Latina and Fiume Santo entered into operation. Laying of the second submarine cable was scheduled for the end of 2010. The submarine cable-laying activity was being carried out by the Cable Lay Vessel (CLV) Giulio Verne owned and operated by Prysmian Group. The cable was inaugurated on 17 March 2011.

== Description ==
The system consists of a 420-kilometre-long (260 mi) submarine cable and 15-kilometre (9 mi) land cables. It has two poles, having a total capacity of 1,000 MW at 500 kV of voltage. The diameter of the submarine cable is 120 millimetres (4 3/4 in). It is connected to the alternating current grids through converter stations in Fiume Santo and Latina at 400 kV of voltage. The substation in Latina extends over a surface area of 35,000 m^{2} (380,000 sq ft), the one in Fiume Santo of 48,000 m^{2} (520,000 sq ft). The cable was manufactured by Prysmian and converter stations were manufactured by ABB. The project cost over €730 million.

== See also ==
- SACOI, the old HVDC link between Sardinia across Corsica to the Italian mainland.
