= Radisson Substation =

Coordinates: 53°43′33″N 77°44′17″W

Radisson Substation is a large electrical substation located near Radisson on the Route de la Baie James highway. The switching station, owned by Hydro-Québec, is the largest substation in its power grid, covering an area of a massive 100 football fields. Electrical power heading into the switchyard is collected via several relatively short alternating current (AC) 735 kilovolt (kV) and AC 315 kV power lines coming from hydroelectric plants like the Robert-Bourassa power station, part of the James Bay Project, located 16 km (10 mi) away. The power from these lines is either raised to AC 735 kV from AC 315 kV, statically inverted to high-voltage direct current (HVDC) +/- 450 kV, or unchanged (735 kV to 735 kV). The amount of electrical energy passing through the substation is 6,600 megawatts (MW). Two AC 735 kV lines and one HVDC +/- 450 kV line, part of the James Bay transmission system, transfer this electrical energy over a distance of 1,000 km (600 mi) to Montreal and Northeast United States.

== See also ==
- Hydro-Québec
- Hydro-Québec's electricity transmission system
- Quebec - New England Transmission
