= Quebec – New England Transmission =

HVDC transmission system in Canada and the United States

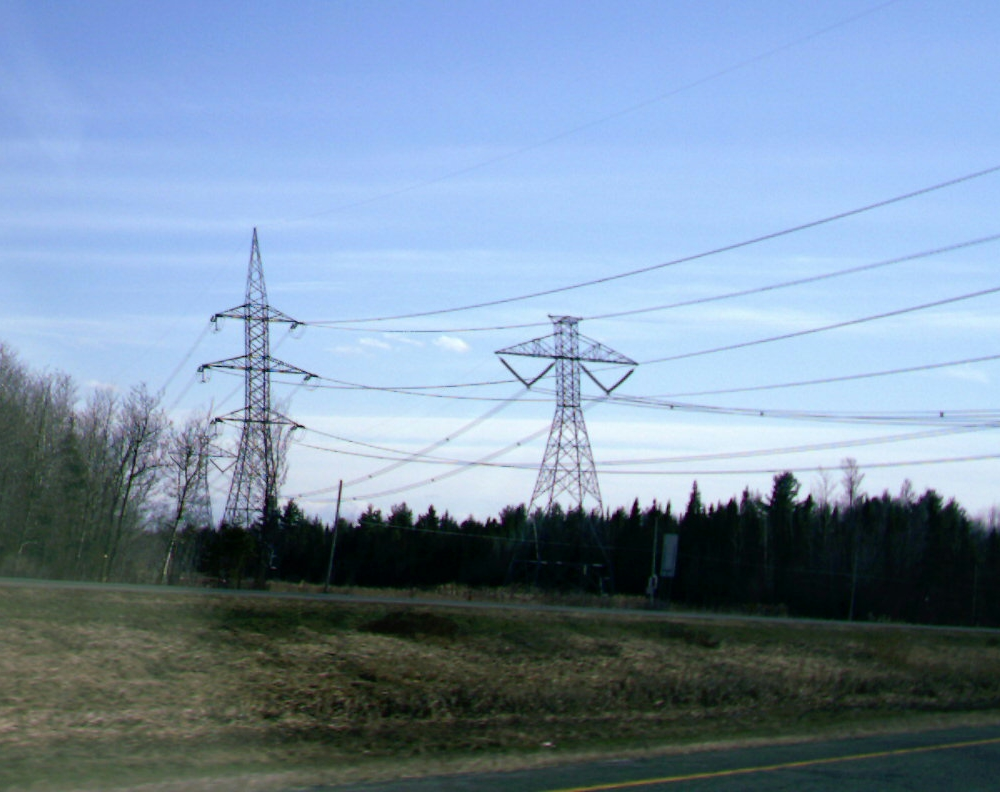
- 450 kV HVDC line (at right), on south side of Autoroute 20 east of the Nicolet station near Sainte-Eulalie, Quebec.
- Map of Quebec – New England Transmission

Location
- Country: Canada, United States
- From: Radisson, Quebec
- To: Sandy Pond, Massachusetts

Technical information
- DC voltage: 450 kV

The Quebec – New England Transmission (officially known in Quebec as the Réseau multiterminal à courant continu (RMCC) and also known as Phase I / Phase II and the Radisson - Nicolet - Des Cantons circuit) is a long-distance high-voltage direct current (HVDC) line between Radisson, Quebec and Westford Road in Ayer, Massachusetts. As of 2012, it remains one of only two Multi-terminal HVDC systems in the world (the other one being the Sardinia–Corsica–Italy system, completed in the same year) and is "the only multi-terminal bipole HVDC system in the world where three stations are interconnected and operate under a common master control system".

== History ==
Initially, the Quebec – New England Transmission consisted of the 172 kilometres (107 mi) section between the Des Cantons station near Windsor, Quebec and the Frank D. Comerford Dam near Monroe, New Hampshire which, because of the asynchronous operation of the American and Québec power grids, had to be implemented as HVDC. This bipolar electricity transmission line, which is overhead for its whole length except the crossing of Saint Lawrence river, went into service in 1986. It could transfer a maximum power of 690 megawatts. The operating voltage was ±450 kV or 900 kV from line to line.

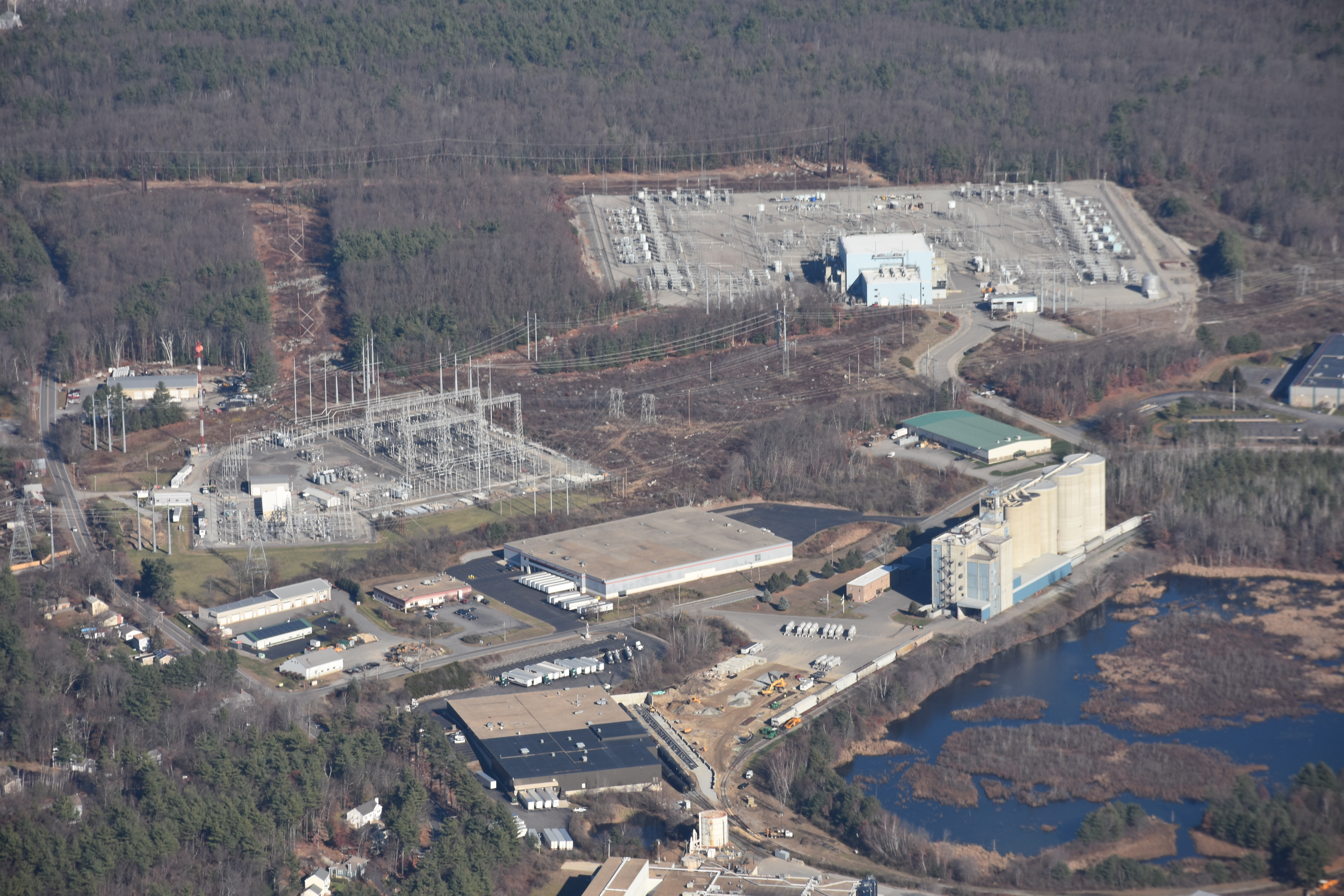
Sandy Pond converter station in Ayer, MA. The HVDC line can be seen near top of the image.

The line was planned to extend beyond the two terminals at Des Cantons and Comerford to the hydroelectric power plants of the La Grande Complex, in the James Bay region of Québec, and to the high consumption area around Boston, Massachusetts — specifically, by 1,100 kilometres (680 mi) to the north toward the converter station at Radisson Substation, and to the south to the converter station at Sandy Pond in Massachusetts. The transmission power was increased by extending the existing converter stations to 2,000 MW, with the value of the transmission voltage remaining unchanged at ±450 kV. For the connection of the Montreal area, a further converter station at Nicolet was put into service in 1992 with a transmission capacity of 2,000 MW.

The line crosses the Saint Lawrence River between Grondines and Lotbinière via a tunnel. Until the tunnel was built, the line crossed the river via an overhead lattice tower electricity pylon—portions of one of these towers would later be used as part of the observation tower at La Cité de l'Énergie in Shawinigan.

=== Decommissioning of Des Cantons and Comerford ===
The Quebec–New England HVDC transmission system originally included five converter stations: Radisson, Nicolet, Sandy Pond, Des Cantons, and Comerford. In the early 2000s, the Des Cantons and Comerford stations were decommissioned due to shifting power flow requirements and improvements in control technology, which allowed the system to operate efficiently with fewer terminals. Despite the reduction, the system retained its multiterminal configuration with three active converters. In 2013, Hydro-Québec partnered with Hitachi Energy (then ABB) to upgrade the control and protection systems at the remaining stations, enhancing reliability and aligning with regional clean energy goals such as the New England Clean Energy Connect.

=== Failed Northern Pass initiative ===
In December 2008, Hydro-Québec, along with American utilities Northeast Utilities (parent company of Public Service of New Hampshire) and NSTAR (parent company of Boston Edison), created a joint venture to build a new HVDC line from Windsor, Quebec to Deerfield, New Hampshire, with an HVDC converter terminal intended to be built in Franklin, New Hampshire. Hydro-Québec would have owned the segment within Quebec, while the segment within the US would have been owned by Northern Pass Transmission LLC, a partnership between Northeast Utilities (75%) and NSTAR (25%). Estimated to cost US$1.1 billion to build, it was projected that the line would either run in existing right-of-way adjacent to the HVDC line that runs through New Hampshire, or it would have connected to a right-of-way in northern New Hampshire that runs through the White Mountains. This 180-to-190-mile (290 to 310 km) line, projected to carry 1,200 MW, would have brought electricity to approximately one million homes.

In order to go ahead, the project needed to receive regulatory approval in Quebec and the United States. The proposed transmission line could have been in operation in 2015. According to Jim Robb, a senior executive from Northeast Utilities, New England could have met one third of its Regional Greenhouse Gas Initiative commitments with the hydropower coming through this new power line alone.

In October 2010, Northeast Utilities announced that it would merge with NSTAR. In effect, Northern Pass Transmission would have become a wholly owned subsidiary of Northeast Utilities, which was renamed Eversource Energy in 2015.

The purchase of power from Hydro-Québec was an issue during the Massachusetts gubernatorial election of 2010.

In July 2019, Eversource issued a statement that the Northern Pass project was now "off the table" after investing $318 million over a decade to develop and promote the project.

=== New England Clean Energy Connect ===
Construction of the New England Clean Energy Connect (NECEC), a similar 1200MW project, started in February 2021. Massachusetts pursued it as an option to bring Canadian hydropower through transmission lines in Maine, estimated to cost $1 billion. The citizens of Maine voted in a 2021 referendum to revoke the project's permit, forcing a halt to construction which was already underway. In August 2022, the Supreme Court of Maine ruled the retroactive revocation of the permit was unconstitutional, but remanded the case to lower courts for more consideration.. Construction resumed in August 2023. A federal judge declined to revoke permits in March 2025. The NECEC entered service on January 16, 2026.

Delays on the project due to the Maine referendum and other political delays cost Massachusetts ratepayers $521 million to cover costs of the construction delays. However, utilities claim the project is still expected to save ratepayers money, as the price of electricity delivered via the line (negotiated with Hydro-Quebec) will be significantly cheaper than forecast market price.

The NECEC HVDC line operates at ±320kV. The line crosses the US-Canada border from Frontenac in Quebec to Beattie Township in Maine. On the US side, it terminates at a converter substation in Lewiston, Maine, where the power is transferred to a 345kV AC line for 1.2 miles that then connects to another existing substation and various transmission lines. On the Canadian side, the HVDC line runs for about 100 kilometres (62 mi) past the US-Canadian border, and terminates at a new converter station at the existing Appalaches substation in Saint-Adrien-d'Irlande.

== Opposition ==
=== 2004 Hydro tower bombing ===
In 2004, shortly before U.S. President George W. Bush's visit to Canada, a tower along the Quebec–New England Transmission circuit in the Eastern Townships near the Canada–US border was damaged by explosive charges detonated at its base. The CBC reported that a message, purportedly from the Résistance internationaliste and issued to the La Presse and Le Journal de Montréal newspapers and CKAC radio, stated that the attack had been carried out to "denounce the 'pillaging' of Quebec's resources by the United States".

=== 2015: Sierra Club of New Hampshire ===
In November 2015, the Sierra Club of New Hampshire expressed opposition to the new line, saying that it would benefit Connecticut and Massachusetts residents more than those in New Hampshire, and expressing concerns about the flooding of boreal forests during the construction of Hydro-Québec's dams in northern Quebec, disputes with the Innu First Nations, and the effects on tourism and the environment within the White Mountain National Forest.

=== 2011-Present: Local government and community opposition ===
A coalition of New Hampshire communities and local government officials oppose the construction of the expanded transmission line. Elected representatives from New Hampshire's 10 counties have expressed opposition, including 114 officials in the New Hampshire House of Representatives and 5 members of the New Hampshire Senate. United States Congressional Representative Carol Shea-Porter and Senators Maggie Hassan and Jeanne Shaheen also oppose expansion of the line. Some of the incumbent power companies in New England oppose it, while other companies favor it.

=== Scientific analysis ===
A 2024 study by Gazar, Borsuk, and Calder used Bayesian network modeling of historical data (1979–2021) to investigate whether proposed expansions of transborder transmission capacity between Quebec and the northeastern United States lead directly to new hydropower reservoir construction in Quebec. Their analysis found that while increased transmission capacity can indirectly affect generation investments by facilitating exports, the primary drivers of hydropower expansion appear to be domestic demand in Quebec and electricity price differences relative to the United States, rather than the construction of new transmission corridors in and of itself. The authors concluded that environmental impacts of large reservoirs are therefore not necessarily a direct consequence of new transmission lines, especially if exports are settled primarily on the short-term market rather than through long-term power purchase agreements.

== See also ==
- Hydro-Québec
- Hydro-Québec's electricity transmission system
- Saint Lawrence River HVDC Powerline Crossing
- Champlain Hudson Power Express

== Bibliography ==
- Bureau d'audiences publiques sur l'environnement (1987). Projet de ligne à courant continu à ±450 kV Radisson - Nicolet - Des Cantons [Radisson - Nicolet -Des Cantons ±450 kV Direct Current Transmission Line Projet] (PDF). Rapport d'enquête et d'audience publique N° 22 (in French). Quebec City. ISBN 2-550-17407-0. Archived from the original (PDF) on 2016-03-04.
- US Department of Energy (January 1984). EIS-0103: Final Environmental Impact Statement - New England/Hydro-Quebec 450-kV Direct Current Transmission Line Interconnection (PDF). DOE/EIS-0103F. Washington, D.C.
- US Department of Energy (August 1987). EIS-0129: Final Environmental Impact Statement - New England/Hydro-Quebec 450 kV Transmission Line Interconnection - Phase II (PDF). DOE/EIS-0129F. Washington, D.C.
