= Overhead line crossing =

Crossing of an obstacle by a power line

Overhead powerline crossing
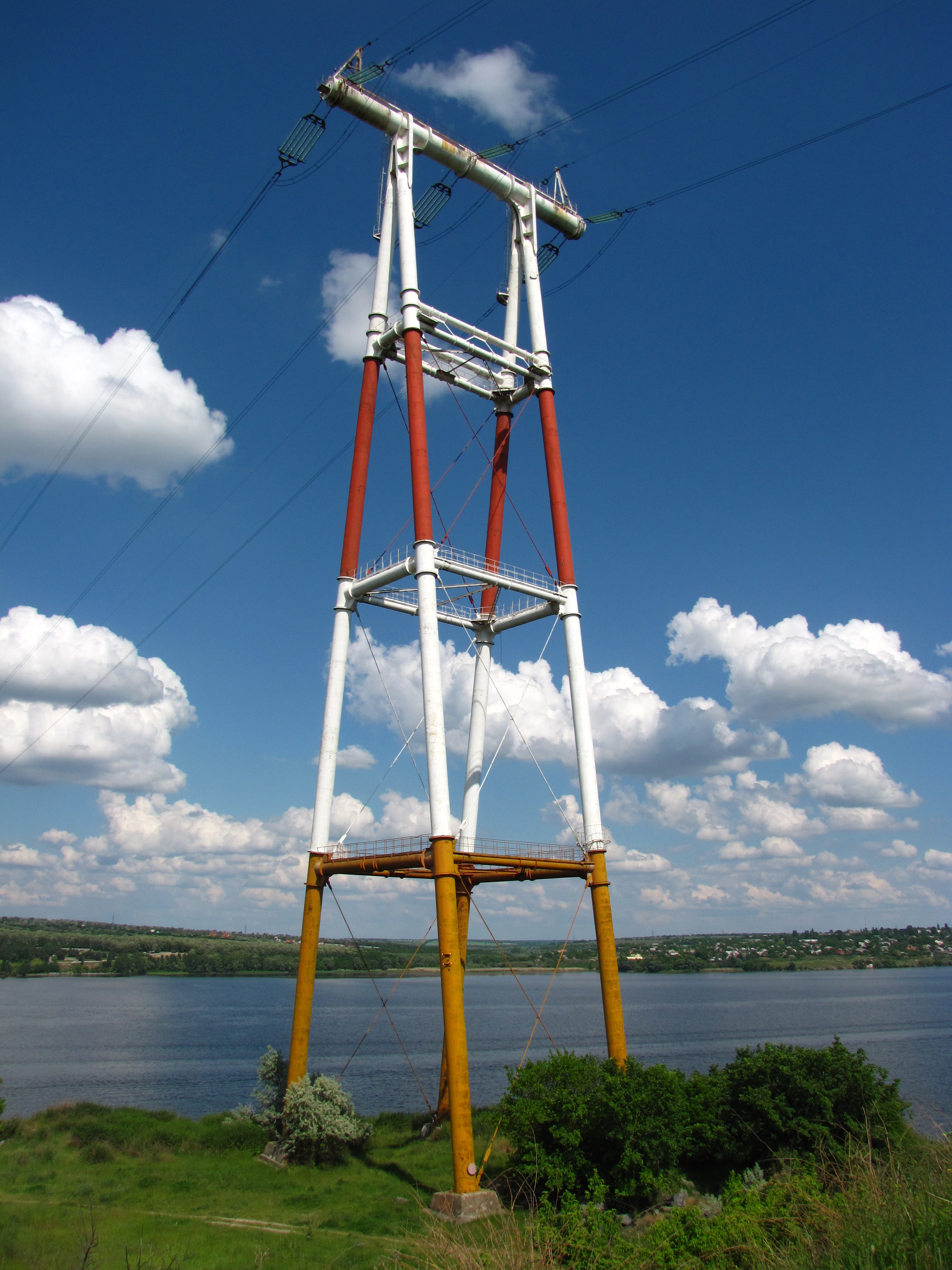
- A crossing tower 330 kV, Ukraine
- Component type: overhead power line
- First produced: 20th century

An overhead line crossing (see Domain specific aliases) is the crossing of an obstacle (such as a traffic route, a river, a valley or a strait) by an overhead power line. The style of crossing depends on the local conditions and regulations at the time the power line is constructed. Overhead line crossings can sometimes require extensive construction and can also have operational issues. In such cases, those in charge of construction should consider whether a crossing of the obstacle would be better accomplished by an underground or submarine cable.

== Domain specific aliases ==
Several related terms are used in engineering, regulatory, and planning contexts. These terms are partly overlapping and may differ slightly in scope or emphasis.

| Term | Typical context | Scope | Notes |
|---|---|---|---|
| Overhead line crossing | Power-engineering and infrastructure descriptions | Overhead power lines crossing obstacles | Describes a span where an overhead line passes over roads, railways, rivers, valleys, or other obstacles. |
| Overhead power line crossing | Technical reports, environmental assessments | Same as above | Explicitly specifies that the crossing involves an overhead power line rather than underground infrastructure. |
| Power line crossing | Regulations and infrastructure agreements | | Broader term often used in railway, road, or utility regulations for any electrical line crossing an infrastructure corridor. |
| Transmission line crossing | Electric-utility and grid-planning documentation | High-voltage transmission lines | Used when referring specifically to crossings by long-distance transmission lines rather than lower-voltage distribution lines. |
| Span crossing | Transmission-line engineering | Individual spans of overhead lines | Refers to a specific span that crosses an obstacle, such as a road-crossing span or river-crossing span. |
| Utility crossing | Transportation and civil-engineering contexts | Any utility infrastructure | Broad term covering crossings by utilities such as power lines, pipelines, or telecommunications cables across transportation corridors. |

== Crossings of roads and railway lines ==
Overhead line crossings of roads, railway lines, and small- and medium-sized watercourses do not normally require special construction. However, in the first years building overhead line when crossing a railway line or a road, a scaffold under the line was required. Later in Germany and some other countries on each end of a powerline crossing of a state-operated railway, a dead-end tower was required, which can still be seen on some old power lines. For overhead line crossings of motorways the pylons must be rebuilt before they wear out, because these demand additional maintenance. If local conditions are appropriate, an overhead line can be implemented by way of a valley bridge. For example, the Koersch valley bridge near Esslingen, Germany carries the 110 kV, three-phase line of the EnBW AG with 2 circuits. Because of the danger of short circuits from falling objects, undercrossings are typically avoided.

== Crossings of overhead lines at state borders ==
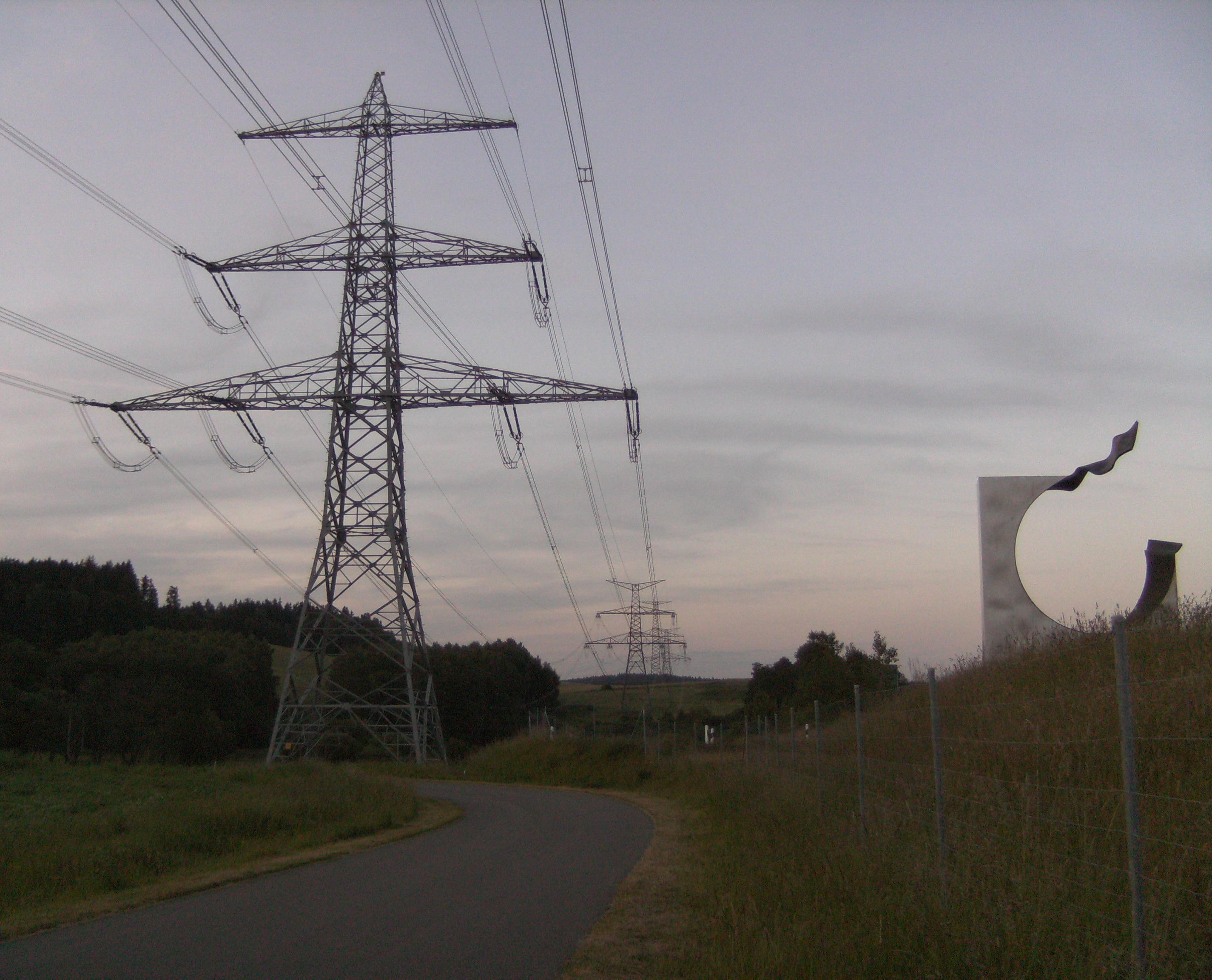
380 kV-powerline crossing the national border between Bavaria, Germany and the Czech Republic near Waidhaus. The pylon in the foreground stands in Bavaria and the others are in the Czech Republic

There is frequently an anchor pylon on each side of state borders, particularly if the lines on either side are operated by different companies. This setup reduces maintenance work, which would otherwise require direct coordination of workers on both sides of the border, and avoids possible authority problems associated with border crossings as much as possible.

== Crossings of other overhead lines ==
At crossings of overhead lines by other overhead lines, the two lines must be kept at the necessary safety distances between the lines and the ground. As a rule, the line with the lower voltage passes under the line with higher voltage. Construction workers try to plan these crossings in such a way that their construction is as economical as possible. This is usually done by leaving the line that is crossed unchanged, if possible. Undercrossings of existing lines are often constructed in proximity to the line's pylons, since this can often be accomplished without raising the existing pylons, and while keeping the necessary safety distances between the ground and the other line.

In the course of undercrossings the pylon picture is frequently changed, and because of its small height it is preferable to create an arrangement with conductors on one level. Sometimes at such crossings there can be problems because of the maximum pylon height allowed for flight safety reasons. If it is not possible at a given location for the pylons of the upper line to be built at a necessary height, the line running below it will be rebuilt on smaller pylons or replaced with an underground cable.

A unique undercrossing of two powerlines can be found north of Kincardine at Scotland at 56°5'17"N 3°43'11"W. Here crosses the powerline Kincardine-Tealing two other lines. One of the two circuits of Kincardine-Tealing powerline crosses these lines on two small pylons and the other circuit via an underground cable.

=== Special crossings from overhead lines of other overhead lines ===
There are some crossings between two overhead powerlines, which are unique, either as both lines are of special type or the unique way of implementation

| Coordinates | Line 1 | Line 2 | Reason of unity |
|---|---|---|---|
| 47°02′48″N 100°05′49″W | CU (Coal Creek Power Station - Rockford, Minnesota) | Square Butte (Center, North Dakota – neighborhood of Adolph in Hermantown, Minnesota) | only crossing of 2 HVDC powerlines in North America |
| 27°22′36″N 78°52′44″E | HVDC Ballia-Bhiwadi ( Ballia - Bhiwadi) | HVDC Rihand-Dadri ( Rihand - Dadri) | crossing of 2 HVDC powerlines |
| 23°19′47″N 112°09′21″E | HVDC Tian–Guang ( Tianshengqiao - Beijiao) | HVDC Guizhou-Guangdong I ( Anshun - Zhaoqing) | crossing of 2 HVDC powerlines |
| 30°55′55″N 114°18′23″E | HVDC Gezhouba - Shanghai ( new) ( Gezhouba - Nan Qiao) | HVDC Three Gorges — Shanghai ( Yidu - Shanghai) | crossing of 2 HVDC powerlines |
| 30°53′40″N 114°10′52″E | HVDC Gezhouba - Shanghai ( old) ( Gezhouba - Nan Qiao) | HVDC Three Gorges — Shanghai ( Yidu - Shanghai) | crossing of 2 HVDC powerlines |
| 30°53′45″N 114°10′10″E | HVDC Gezhouba - Shanghai ( new) ( Gezhouba - Nan Qiao) | HVDC Gezhouba - Shanghai ( old) ( Gezhouba - Nan Qiao) | crossing of 2 HVDC powerlines |
| 30°48′25″N 120°31′49″E | HVDC Gezhouba - Shanghai ( Gezhouba - Nan Qiao) | HVDC Xiangjiaba-Shanghai ( Fulong - Fenxia) | crossing of 2 HVDC powerlines |
| 30°56′38″N 121°21′59″E | HVDC Gezhouba - Shanghai ( Gezhouba - Nan Qiao) | HVDC Xiangjiaba-Shanghai ( Fulong - Fenxia) | crossing of 2 HVDC powerlines |
| 23°33′54″N 111°48′59″E | HVDC Yunnan–Guangdong ( Yunnan - Zengcheng) | HVDC Guizhou-Guangdong I ( Anshun - Zhaoqing) | crossing of 2 HVDC powerlines |
| 30°14′0″N 111°54′21″E | HVDC Xiangjiaba-Shanghai ( Fulong - Fenxia) | HVDC Three Gorges-Guangdong ( Jingzhou - Huizhou) | crossing of 2 HVDC powerlines |
| 29°52′46″N 111°49′45″E | HVDC Xiangjiaba-Shanghai ( Fulong - Fenxia) | HVDC Three Gorges-Guangdong ( Jingzhou - Huizhou) | crossing of 2 HVDC powerlines |
| 60°28′45″N 17°14′11″E | Fenno–Skan 2 (Finnbole - Rauma) | Tierp-Gävle | only crossing of HVDC overhead line with single phase AC line in the world |
| 56°21′37″N 94°36′36″W | Nelson River Bipole 2 | electrode line of Nelson River Bipole 1 | crossing of HVDC and electrode line of another scheme |
| 30°45′25″N 112°05′43″E | HVDC Three Gorges – Changzhou | electrode line of HVDC Hubei - Shanghai | crossing of HVDC and electrode line of another scheme |
| 30°54′25″N 121°07′53″E | HVDC Gezhouba-Shanghai | electrode line of HVDC Xiangjiaba-Shanghai | crossing of HVDC and electrode line of another scheme |
| 30°37′34″N 111°55′28″E | HVDC Three Gorges-Changzhou | electrode line of HVDC Hubei—Shanghai | crossing of HVDC and electrode line of another scheme |
| 30°38′10″N 111°56′02″E | HVDC Gezhouba–Shanghai | electrode line of HVDC Hubei—Shanghai | crossing of HVDC and electrode line of another scheme |
| 30°38′10″N 111°56′02″E | HVDC Gezhouba–Shanghai | electrode line of HVDC Three Gorges-Changzhou | crossing of HVDC and electrode line of another scheme |
| 23°44′55″N 113°20′18″E | HVDC Yunnan–Guangdong | electrode line of HVDC Guizhou-Guangdong II | crossing of HVDC and electrode line of another scheme |
| 21°45′5″N 48°31′58″E | HVDC Rio Madeira I | electrode line of HVDC Rio Madeira II | crossing of HVDC and electrode line of another scheme |
| 50°05′30″N 97°26′12″W | Nelson River Bipole 1 & 2 | electrode line of Nelson River Bipole 2 | crossing of HVDC and its electrode line and electrode line of another scheme |
| 50°10′04″N 97°24′50″W | electrode line of Nelson River Bipole 1 | electrode line of Nelson River Bipole 2 | electrode line crosses electrode line of other HVDC |
| 21°45′03″N 48°31′58″W | electrode line of HVDC Rio Madeira I | electrode line of HVDC Rio Madeira II | electrode line crosses electrode line of other HVDC |
| 56°21′15″N 94°37′08″W | Nelson River Bipole 1 & 2 | electrode line of Nelson River Bipole 1 | crossing of HVDC and its electrode line and electrode line of another scheme |
| 23°44′29″S 47°16′43″W | HVDC Itaipu, Bipole South | electrode lines of HVDC Itaipu ( Bipole South & North) | crossing of HVDC and its electrode line and electrode line of another scheme |
| 23°41′48″S 47°22′17″W | HVDC Itaipu, Bipole North | electrode lines of HVDC Itaipu ( Bipole South & North) | crossing of HVDC and its electrode line and electrode line of another scheme |
| 45°35′48″N 71°50′11″W | electrode line of Quebec – New England Transmission | electrode line of Quebec – New England Transmission | crossing of two electrode lines belonging to the same HVDC-scheme |
| 45°36′20″N 71°51′03″W | electrode line of Quebec – New England Transmission | electrode line of Quebec – New England Transmission | crossing of two electrode lines belonging to the same HVDC-scheme |
| 49°03′37″N 123°04′33″W | HVDC Vancouver Island (Delta - Duncan) | electrode line of HVDC Vancouver Island (Delta - Duncan) | crossing of HVDC and its return line |
| 48°44′1″N 38°43′26″E | HVDC Volgograd-Donbass (Mikhailkovkaya - Volgograd) | electrode line of HVDC Volgograd-Donbass (Mikhailkovkaya - Smile) | crossing of HVDC and its electrode line |
| 56°26′42″N 94°11′03″W | Nelson River Bipole 2 | electrode line of Nelson River Bipole 2 | crossing of HVDC and its electrode line |
| 56°30′01″N 94°08′41″W | Nelson River Bipole 2 | electrode line of Nelson River Bipole 2 | crossing of HVDC and its electrode line |
| 25°51′21″S 28°22′37″E | HVDC Cahora Bassa (Apollo - Songo) | electrode line of HVDC Cahora Bassa (Apollo - Glastonbury Ridge) | crossing of HVDC and its electrode line |
| 15°42′23″S 32°51′19″E | HVDC Cahora Bassa (Apollo - Songo) | electrode line of HVDC Cahora Bassa, Pole 1 ( Songo - Tete) | crossing of HVDC and its electrode line |
| 15°42′23″S 32°51′19″E | HVDC Cahora Bassa | electrode line of HVDC Cahora Bassa, Pole 2 ( Songo - Tete) | crossing of HVDC pole with electrode line of other pole |
| 45°34′13″N 71°52′03″W | Quebec – New England Transmission | electrode line of Quebec – New England Transmission | crossing of HVDC and its electrode line |
| 45°33′25″N 71°56′16″W | Quebec – New England Transmission | electrode line of Quebec – New England Transmission | crossing of HVDC and its electrode line |
| 26°17′03″N 105°50′31″E | HVDC Guizhou-Guangdong I | electrode line of HVDC Guizhou-Guangdong I | crossing of HVDC and its electrode line |
| 28°32′36″N 104°26′34″E | HVDC Xiangjiaba–Shanghai | electrode line of HVDC Xiangjiaba–Shanghai | crossing of HVDC and its electrode line |
| 23°44′34″N 113°20′49″E | HVDC Yunnan–Guangdong | electrode line of HVDC Yunnan–Guangdong | crossing of HVDC and its electrode line |
| 08°55′03″S 63°57′20″W | HVDC Rio Madeira II | electrode line of HVDC Rio Madeira II | crossing of HVDC and its electrode line |
| 19°08′21″N 81°23′53″E | HVDC Sileru-Barsoor | electrode line of HVDC Sileru-Barsoor | crossing of HVDC and its electrode line |
| 50°28′55″N 9°40′52″E | Flieden-Bebra | Fulda-Gemünden | crossing of 2 single phase AC power lines |
| 51°01′59″N 9°34′31″E | Bebra-Borken | Fulda-Körle | crossing of 2 single phase AC power lines |
| 48°56′40″N 8°48′18″E | Karlsruhe-Mühlacker | Vaihingen-Graben/Neudorf | crossing of 2 single phase AC power lines |
| 50°39′15″N 7°19′28″E | Orscheid-Köln | Orscheid-Montabaur | crossing of 2 single phase AC power lines |
| 49°25′38″N 8°34′9″E | Mannheim-Neckarelz | Mannheim-Wiesental | crossing of 2 single phase AC power lines |
| 47°20′09″N 13°11′27″E | Sankt Johann im Pongau-Bruck/Fusch | Sankt Johann im Pongau-Selzthal | crossing of 2 single phase AC power lines |
| 47°20′01″N 13°11′17″E | Sankt Johann im Pongau-Uttendorf | Sankt Johann im Pongau-Mallnitz | crossing of 2 single phase AC power lines |
| 47°17′47″N 13°04′24″E | Sankt Johann im Pongau-Bruck/Fusch | Sankt Johann im Pongau-Mallnitz | crossing of 2 single phase AC power lines |
| 47°15′46″N 12°33′59″E | Sankt Johann im Pongau-Schneiderau | Bruck/Fusch-Uttendorf | crossing of 2 single phase AC power lines |
| 47°15′45″N 12°33′59″E | Sankt Johann im Pongau-Schneiderau | Uttendorf-Kitzbühl | crossing of 2 single phase AC power lines |
| 47°15′44″N 12°33′59″E | Sankt Johann im Pongau-Schneiderau | Uttendorf-Enzingerboden | crossing of 2 single phase AC power lines |
| 47°15′45″N 12°33′55″E | Bruck/Fusch-Enzingerboden | Uttendorf-Kitzbühl | crossing of 2 single phase AC power lines |
| 47°11′49″N 12°36′28″E | Uttendorf-Enzingerboden, Schneiderau Branch | Schneiderau-Enzingerboden | crossing of 2 single phase AC power lines |
| 47°10′39″N 12°37′34″E | Uttendorf-Enzingerboden | Schneiderau-Enzingerboden | crossing of 2 single phase AC power lines |
| 47°11′38″N 12°37′00″E | Uttendorf-Enzingerboden | Schneiderau-Enzingerboden | crossing of 2 single phase AC power lines |
| 46°33′45″N 6°31′45″E | Bussigny-Croy | Romanel-Les Tuileries | crossing of 2 single phase AC power lines |
| 46°32′09″N 6°48′11″E | Puidoux-Kerzers | Bussigny-Chamoson | crossing of 2 single phase AC power lines |
| 46°22′07″N 6°55′23″E | Puidoux-Vernayaz | Bussigny-Chamoson | crossing of 2 single phase AC power lines |
| 46°10′26″N 7°01′50″E | Puidoux-Vernayaz | Bussigny-Chamoson | crossing of 2 single phase AC power lines |
| 46°08′48″N 7°02′16″E | Puidoux-Vernayaz | Vernayaz Branch | crossing of 2 single phase AC power lines |
| 46°06′52″N 7°05′55″E | Vernayaz-Brig | Bussigny-Chamoson | crossing of 2 single phase AC power lines |
| 56°2′26″N 3°53′20″W | Longannet Power Station - Glasgow, Carmyle | Longannet Power Station - Glasgow, Bishopbridge | Powerline Longannet Power Station - Glasgow, Bishopbridge crosses powerline Longannet Power Station - Glasgow, Carmyle as underground cable |
| 56°5′17″N 3°43′11″W | Longannet Power Station - Glasgow, Carmyle, Longannet Power Station - Glasgow, Bishopbridge | Kincardine - Tealing | one circuit of double-circuit line crosses two powerlines as underground cable |

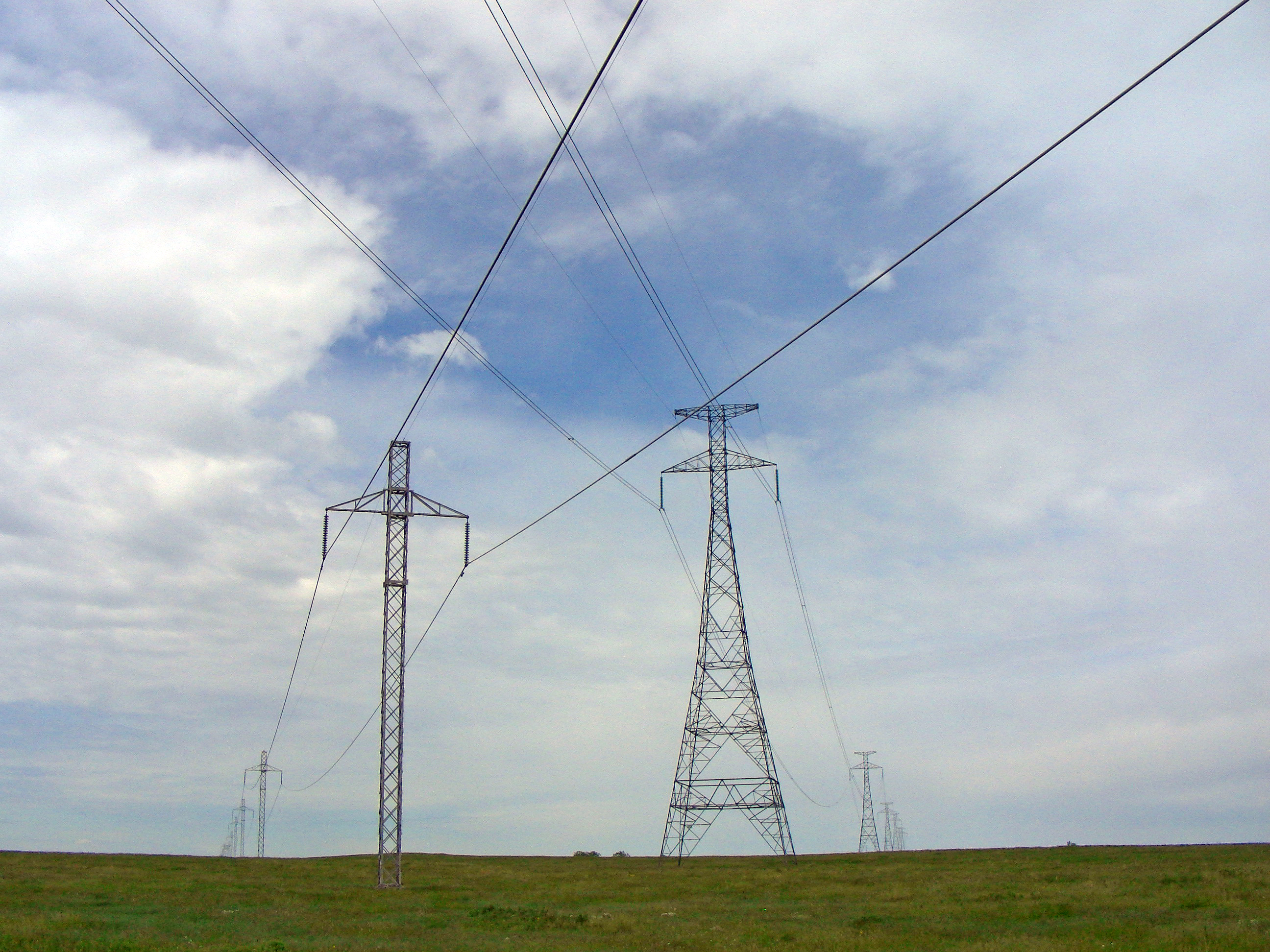
The only crossing of two different HVDC overhead powerlines in the Western hemisphere, CU ( small pylons) and Square Butte ( large pylons) in North Dakota

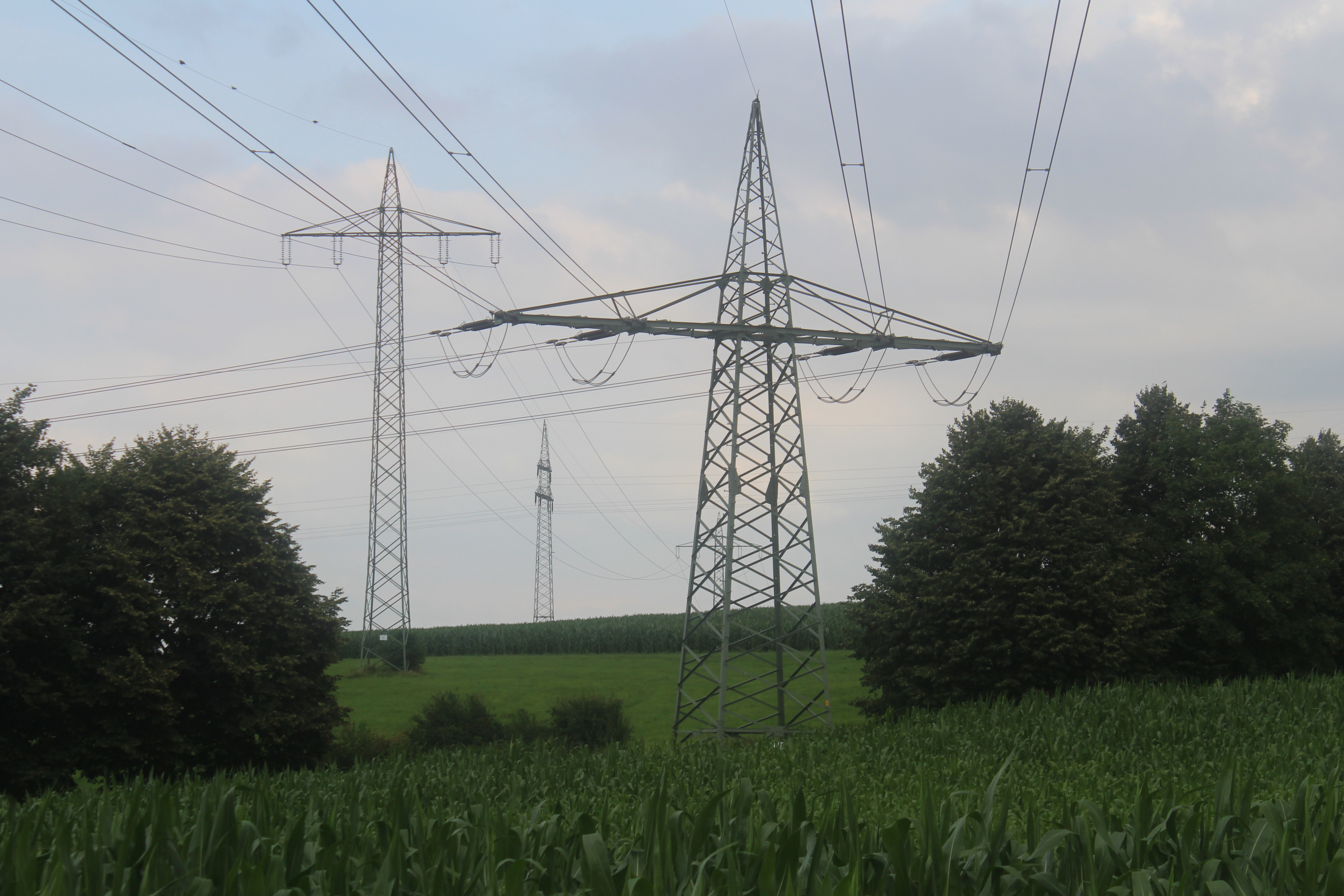
Crossing of single phase AC powerline Fulda-Gemünden ( tower on the right) with single phase AC powerline Flieden-Bebra ( tower on the left)

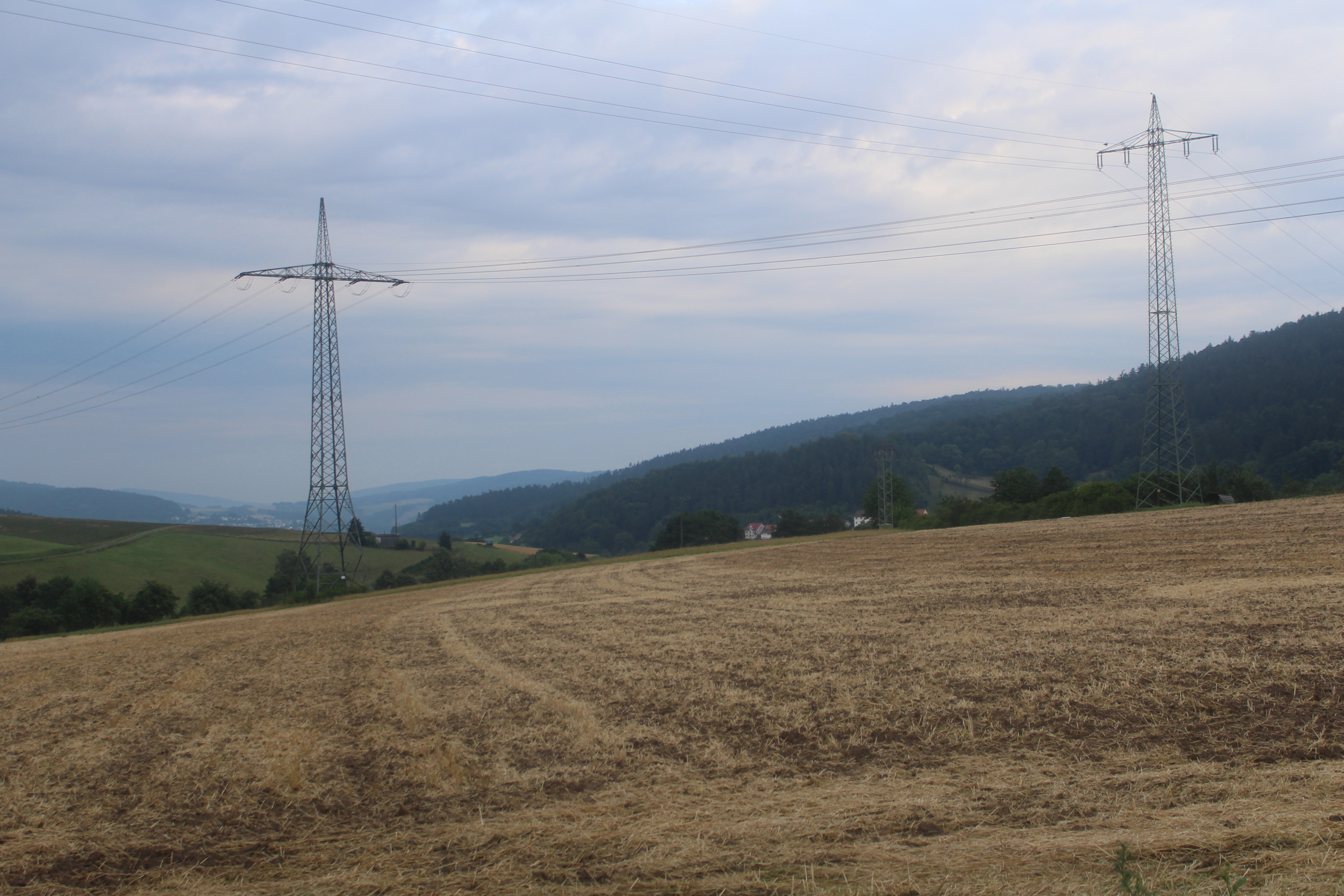
Crossing of single phase AC powerline Borken-Bebra ( tower on the right) with single phase AC powerline Fulda-Körle ( tower on the left)

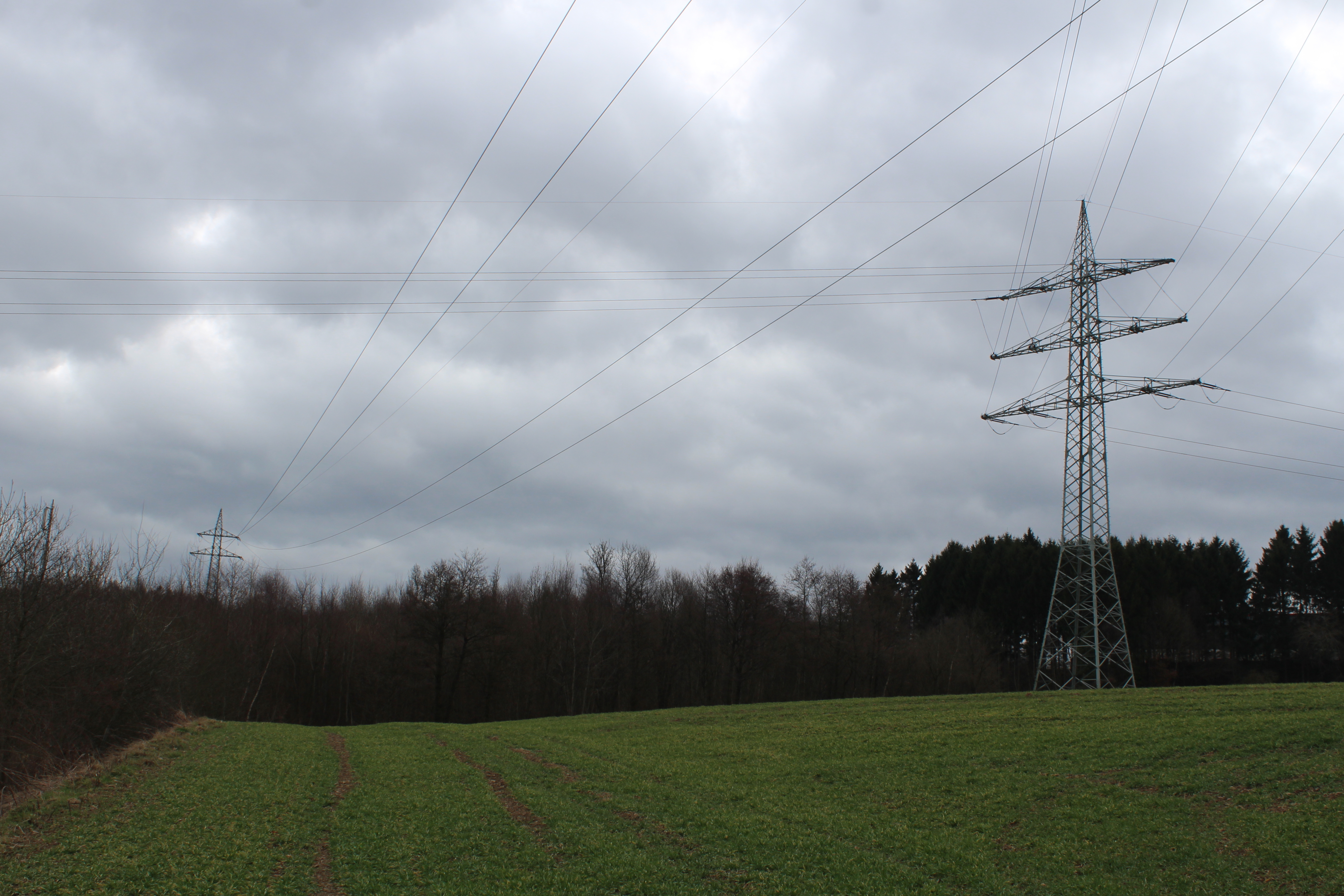
Crossing of single phase AC powerline Orscheid-Montabaur ( lower line) with single phase AC powerline Orscheid-Cologne ( higher line)

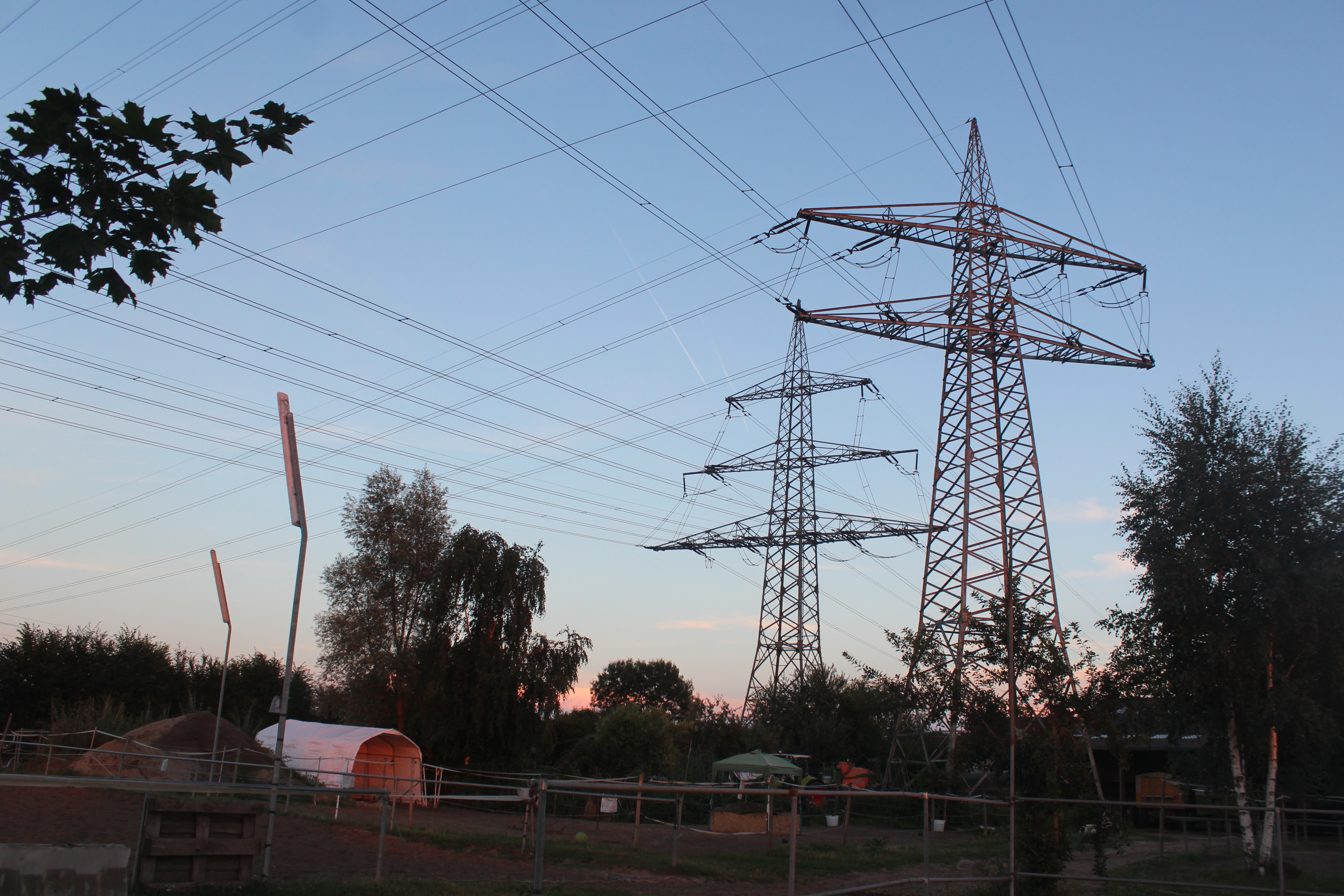
Crossing of single phase AC powerline Mannheim-Neckarelz ( tower on the right) with single phase AC powerline Mannheim-Wiesental ( tower on the left)

== Overhead line crossings of aerial tramways ==
Overhead lines should cross the route of an aerial tramway only above it.

In principle, over- and undercrossings of aerial tramways are completely regulated. In the case of an undercrossing of an aerial tramway, the maximum safety distances between the overhead line and the floor of the aerial tramway cab must be followed absolutely.

Frequently at the range of the crossing section, special precautionary measures are taken. Thus, at overhead line crossings at which the overhead line runs above the rope of the aerial tramway, two catch ropes are occasionally installed to prevent the conductor from falling off the rope of the tramway in case a pylon or insulator were to break. Alternatively, auxiliary cross-bars can be installed on the pylons of the overhead line under the conductors, which prevent the conductor cables from falling in case of an insulator failure on the aerial tramway. Occasionally, the span field of the line over the aerial ropeway can be scaffolded with a rigid construction along its whole length, or at least for the span which crosses the aerial tramway.

At crossings at which the aerial tramway runs above the power line, the line is frequently installed on special masts in the crossing range, which scaffold the line in the area of the aerial tramway crossing. Such a measure is not necessary according to power line regulations, but it is often done because, in case of aerial tramway failure, it is possible to rescue people from the tram without switching off the overhead line. Such constructions may be seen at 110 kV power line crossings of the Penkenbahn at Mayrhofen, the Patscherkofelbahn at Innsbruck and south of Zermatt.

== Overhead line crossings of broad rivers and straits ==
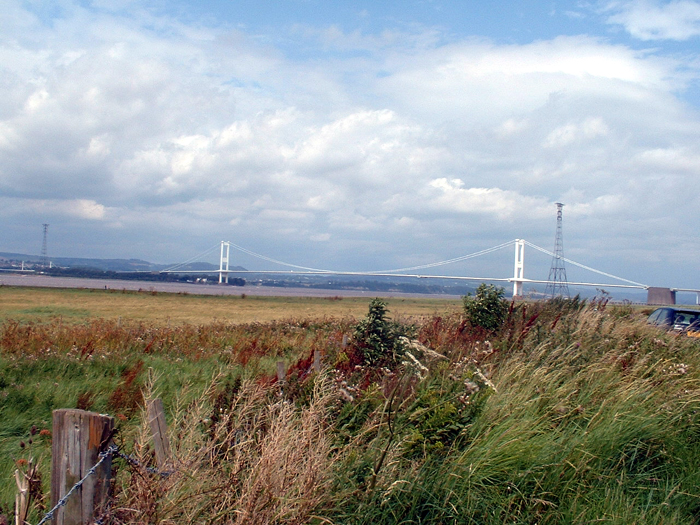
The two masts of the high level crossing of the River Severn estuary between England and Wales, with the Severn Bridge behind. These masts are 1.6km (1 mile) apart: a further 1.2-km line crosses the River Wye estuary to the left.

Overhead line crossings of broad rivers and of straits, if the terrain on both sides is relatively even, frequently consist of four pylons: two particularly substantial anchor pylons for bracing the conductors of the crossing section, and two tall carrying masts to keep the line high over the water. These pylons have broader cross-bars and greater distances between the cross-bars than the other pylons of the line, in order to prevent the conductor cables from striking against each other during strong winds. In contrast to normal pylons, the two carrying masts at both ends of the crossing are frequently equipped with flight safety lamps, and have stairways for easy access to the top.

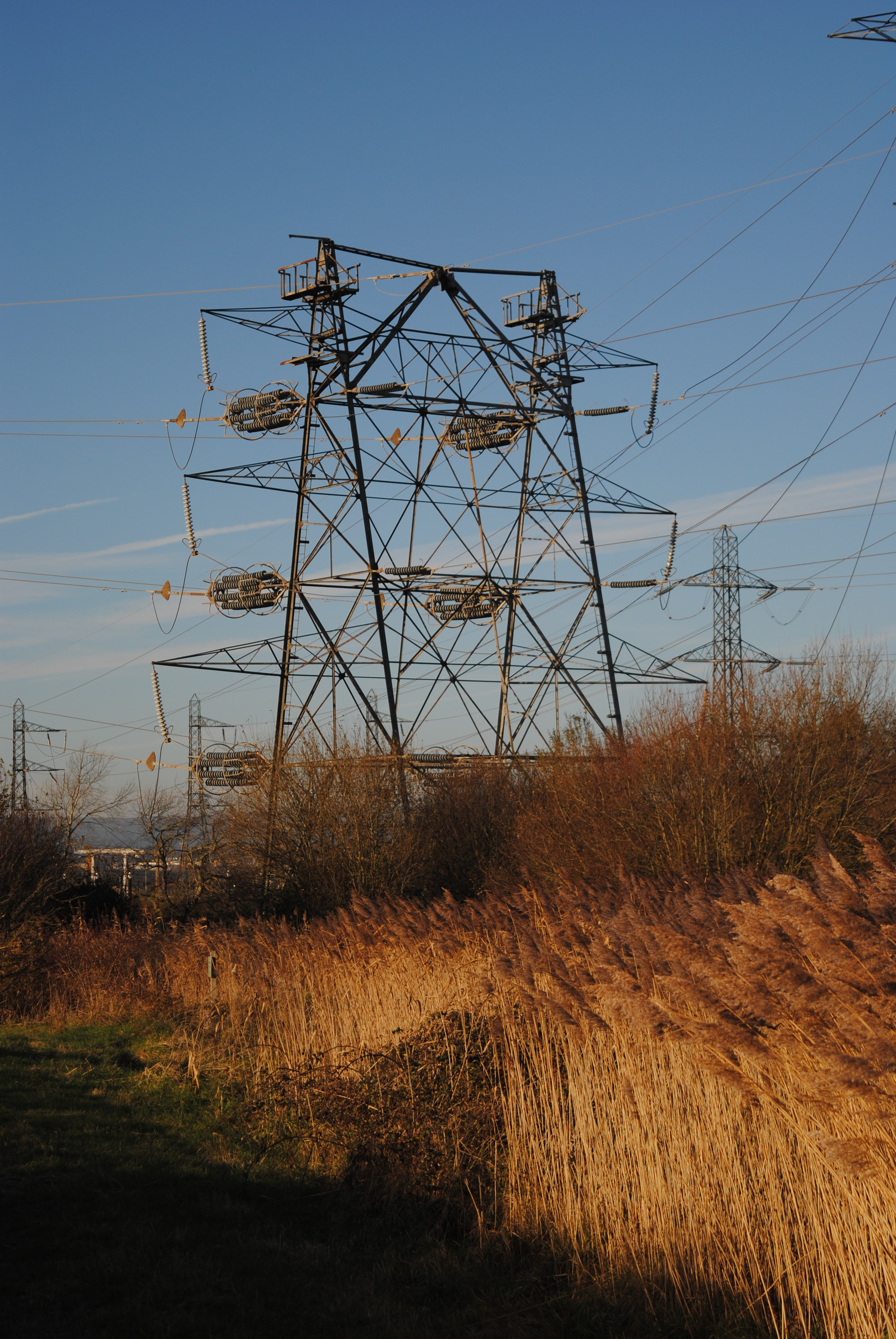
anchor portal of the River Usk crossing

Overhead line crossings of rivers and straits with spans of over 2 km are frequently prohibitively expensive to build and operate; because of the danger of wind-induced oscillatory movements of the conductor cables, it is necessary either to install very large leader distances or to mount insulators between the conductors in the area of the span. Bundle conductors, which are used for almost all extra-high voltage lines, are more susceptible to oscillations from wind forces than single conductors. Therefore, single conductors must be used for the crossing section, which means the crossing section of the power line determines the maximum transmittable power.

Further, one cannot build pylons arbitrarily high at either end of the crossing section, and there is a usually a considerable minimum height because of ships crossing under the line, so there is often a high mechanical tension in the conductors at long spans. This tension requires conductors made largely of steel, which have a worse electrical conductivity than the common overhead line conductors consisting of copper, Aldrey or aluminum-encased steel, and also limits the amount of transmittable electrical power. For this reason, for crossings with a span width of more than approximately 2 km, those in charge of construction should consider laying an underwater cable as the more practicable solution.

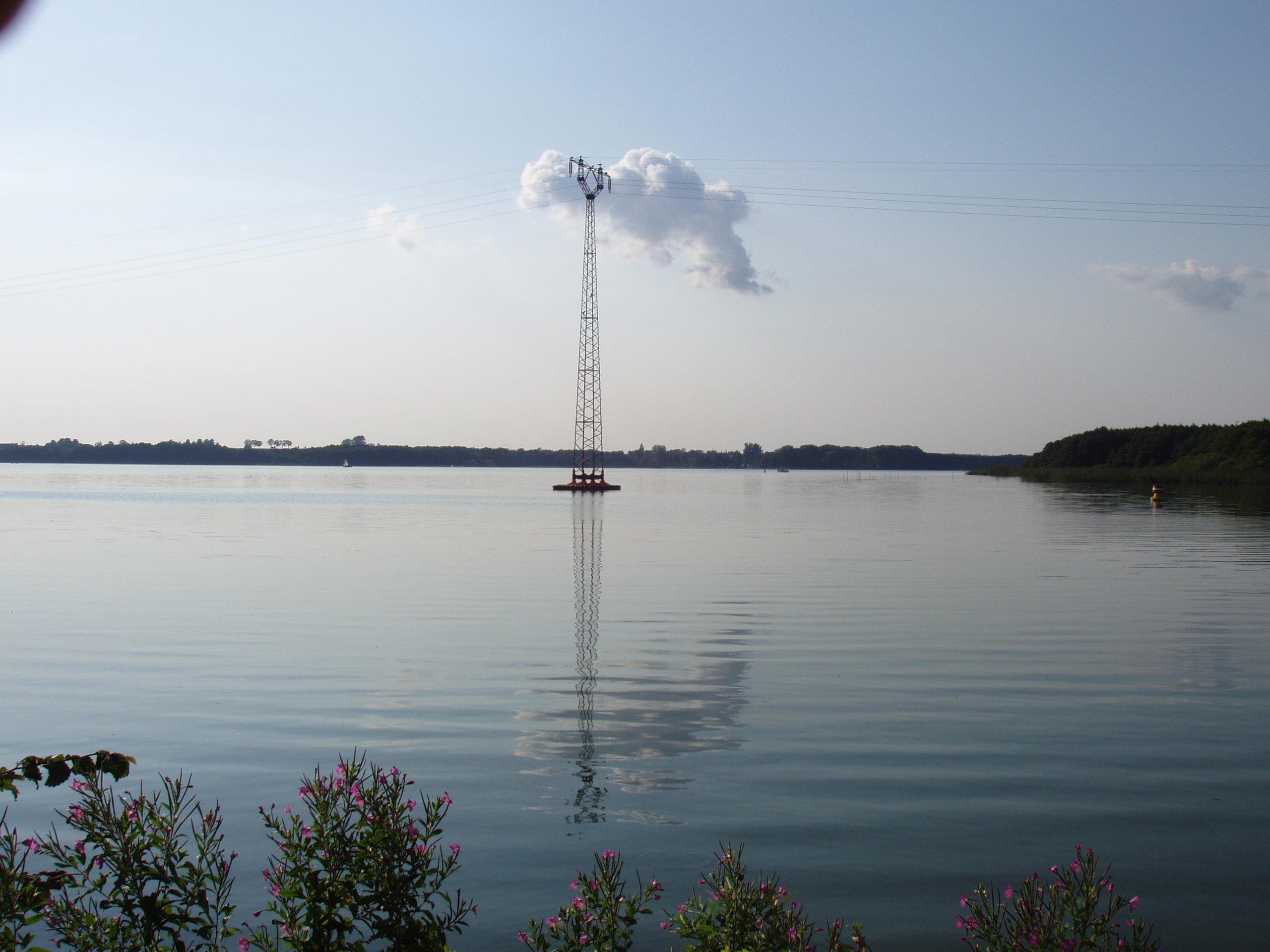
pylon in Lake Schwerin

Alternatively, it might be possible to erect one or more pylons in the water to be crossed. Such crossings can be seen occasionally in North America. They are, however, only used when it is more economical and practical to do so than to lay a cable underwater, such as when the water is not very deep and no large passage heights are needed for vessels. Also, such construction can be very problematic as far as getting legal permission to build, because pylons standing in the water are likely to be considered dangerous obstacles for ships, especially in foggy conditions.

In some cases on bridges small crossing a wider waterway pylons or crossbars for the conductors can be mounted. Such a solution, which may lead to safety problems at bridge maintenance, was for example realized at the Danish Storstrøm Bridge.

It is quite likely that overhead line crossings of broad waters can be replaced with underwater cables. The overhead line crossing the Strait of Messina — which, with a span of 3646 meters, was one of the longest overhead line crossings in the world, with 200-meter pylons among the highest in the world — was replaced by a submarine cable, because of its small maximum transmittable electrical power.

== Overhead line crossing of valleys ==
Overhead line crossings of valleys consist of two anchor pylons, one at either end of the valley. If the topography of the valley is suitable, these do not need to be very high. In very wide valleys, it is better to use a pylon for each phase in order to achieve sufficient distance between the conductors. In these cases there is frequently a further anchor pylon behind the crossing, used in order to realize the angle change of the conductor cables behind these. The problems associated with large spans also exist in these cases, but these can be easily and economically ameliorated, if the topography does not require high crossing pylons, by using a separate pylon for each conductor.

== Structures ==
A crossing pylon is used for crossing over a body of water or a valley. Due to the long span, crossing pylons across rivers and sea straits are frequently taller than standard pylons. They may have marking lamps, and unlike standard pylons, often have stairways for easy access to the top. In many cases, their height makes them ideal for carrying radio antennas and transmitting equipment.

Crossing pylons for valleys, depending on the local topography, are not necessarily tall, but the distance between the conducting cables must be sufficient to prevent high winds knocking the conductors into one another; these pylons have wide crossbars to prevent this. For very long spans each phase has a separate pylon, particularly if the pylons are short.

Special crossing pylons are often used where aerial tramways cross power lines. These pylons are designed with integral scaffolding so that the tramway cars can be reached without touching a live power line. This enables passengers to be rescued from the tramway if it fails without cutting the power from the power line. Such installations can be found, for example, south of Zermatt, Switzerland; at the Patscherkofelbahn near Innsbruck, Austria; and at the Penkenbahn in Mayrhofen, Austria.

== See also ==
- List of spans
