= Résistance internationaliste =

- Dates active: December 2004 – present
- Active regions: Quebec, Canada
- Ideology: Anarchism; Antimilitarism; Anti-capitalism; Anti-Americanism
- Status: Active

The Initiative de résistance internationaliste (English: International Resistance Initiative), more commonly known as Résistance internationaliste, is a left-wing group operating in the Canadian province of Quebec. Résistance internationaliste first surfaced in December 2004. Based on communiqués believed to originate from the group, the Résistance internationaliste appears to hold anti-capitalist, environmentalist and anti-American views. The group has claimed responsibility for three attacks, all in Canada.

== Hydro tower bombing ==
In 2004, shortly before U.S. President George W. Bush's visit to Canada, a Hydro-Québec electric tower along the Quebec – New England Transmission circuit in the Eastern Townships of Quebec near the Canada–US border was damaged by explosive charges detonated at its base. The CBC reported that a message, purportedly from the Résistance internationaliste and issued to La Presse, Le Journal de Montréal and CKAC radio, stated that the attack had been carried out to "denounce the 'pillaging' of Quebec's resources by the United States."

== Car firebombing ==
On Friday, August 4, 2006, a car belonging to Carol Montreuil, a spokesman for the Canadian Petroleum Products Institute, exploded in the town of Sainte-Thérèse, near Montreal. After having initially concluded that the explosion was the result of an electrical malfunction, the Sûreté du Québec provincial police force ordered an investigation by its anti-terrorism branch when a number of media outlets received an email from a source claiming to be the Résistance internationaliste. The email stated that the group had carried out the attack in protest against the actions of oil companies, in particular the alleged funding of "an imperialist army which is committing barbarous acts", an apparent reference to the war in Iraq. The CBC reported that the same email also contained accusations against the oil companies of consumer abuse and environmental degradation. On August 18 of the same year, the Sûreté du Québec confirmed that the car was indeed firebombed, as claimed by the email.

== Canadian Forces recruiting office ==
The Résistance internationaliste has also allegedly claimed the responsibility of planting a bomb at a recruiting station of the Canadian Forces in Trois-Rivières, Quebec. At 2:37 a.m., on July 2, 2010, a call was placed to the Trois-Rivières municipal police force stating there was a bomb at the recruiting station. At 3 a.m., the bomb exploded, but no one was injured according to local newspaper Le Nouvelliste.
