= Kennebec Valley =

Coordinates: 44°12′6.83″N 69°58′18.93″W

The Kennebec Valley is a region of the U.S. state of Maine, consisting of the Somerset, Kennebec, and sometimes Androscoggin Counties. The area formed as a result of the Wisconsin Glaciation.
