= 2021 Maine Question 1 =

- Electric Transmission Line Restrictions and Legislative Approval Initiative

Results
Choice	Votes	%
Yes	243,943	59.20%
No	168,143	40.80%
Total votes	412,086	100.00%
County results
Yes
70–80%
60–70%
50–60%
No
50–60%

Maine Question 1, the Legislative Approval of Certain Electric Transmission Lines Initiative, was on the ballot in Maine as an indirect initiated state statute on November 2, 2021. It was approved, with 59.20% voting in favor, but was ultimately unsuccessful in its main goal to block construction of the New England Clean Energy Connect powerline, due to subsequent legal action.

== Contents ==
The measure appeared on the ballot as follows:

Do you want to ban the construction of high-impact electric transmission lines in the Upper Kennebec Region and to require the Legislature to approve all other such projects anywhere in Maine, both retroactively to 2020, and to require the Legislature, retroactively to 2014, to approve by a two-thirds vote such projects using public land?

== Results ==
The measure was approved with about 59% of the vote.

Question 1
Choice	Votes	%
For	243,943	59.20
Against	168,143	40.80
Total	412,086	100.00

== Aftermath ==
Developers of the New England Clean Energy Connect sued on November 3, 2021, the day after the referendum, to assert that the law established by the referendum could not be retroactively applied to their project due to construction being far enough along, referred to as "vested rights" in the project. After a trial, on April 20, 2023, a jury unanimously agreed, eventually allowing construction on the power line to resume. A lawsuit to pull the federal permits issued to the project was denied in March 2025, ending the last legal challenge to the project. Construction will be completed by the end of 2025, with the corridor coming online in 2026 after a testing period.
