= 2021 New York state elections =

- November 2, 2021

The 2021 New York state elections were held on November 2, 2021. In addition to the standard local elections, many seats for the New York Supreme Court were to be filled, in addition to ballot proposals regarding changing state electoral rules and court limits.

== State ballot proposals ==
=== Proposal 1 ===
This is a proposed constitutional amendment that would freeze the number of state senators at 63, amend the process for counting the state's population, delete certain provisions that violate the U.S. Constitution, repeal and amend certain requirements for the appointment of the co-executive directors of the redistricting commission, and amend the manner of drawing district lines for congressional and state legislative offices.

The measure would also scrap the current requirement that two-thirds of state lawmakers must agree to pass redistricting plans, in favor of simple majorities in both the Assembly and Senate. The proposal's opponents, including The League of Women Voters of New York State, have focused on this point, saying that allowing a simple majority to make such decisions could diminish a minority party's voting power.

=== Proposal 2 ===
This proposed amendment to Article I of the New York State Constitution would establish the right of each person to clean air and water and a healthful environment.

This measure would give New Yorkers a constitutional right to clean air, water and a "healthful environment." The proposal language is vague on what a "healthful environment" is or how the standard would be legally enforced. Critics of the measure have cited its broad language as a concern, arguing that the lack of specificity could lead to unnecessary lawsuits. State Senator Dan Stec, a Republican who represents the North Country region, said in a statement that the proposal would place the burden of enforcement on the courts.

=== Proposal 3 ===
This proposed amendment would delete the current requirement in Article II, Section 5 (of the New York State Constitution) that a citizen be registered to vote at least ten days before an election and would allow the Legislature to enact laws permitting a citizen to register to vote less than ten days before the election.

If passed, the measure would make it possible for state lawmakers to adopt same-day voter registration, something that 20 states already have. The measure would be particularly beneficial to voters who do not start paying attention to local politics until late in the election cycle, said Jan Combopiano, the senior policy director for the Brooklyn Voters Alliance.

=== Proposal 4 ===
This proposed amendment would delete from the current provision on absentee ballots the requirement that an absentee voter must be unable to appear at the polls by reason of absence from the county or illness or physical disability.

Under current law, mail-in ballots are only allowed for voters who expect to be away on Election Day, or who have an illness or disability that would prevent them from voting in person. There was an increase in absentee ballots cast last year because of the coronavirus pandemic; Gov. Andrew M. Cuomo issued an executive order automatically providing all New Yorkers with absentee ballot applications.

=== Proposal 5 ===
The proposed amendment would increase the New York City Civil Court's jurisdiction by allowing it to hear and decide claims for up to $50,000 instead of the current jurisdictional limit of $25,000.

In theory, the measure is meant to make it faster, easier and less expensive for people to resolve disputes legally. Although the change would be likely to increase the efficiency with which lawsuits are resolved, it might also increase the workload for the city's civil courts, which are already understaffed, said Sidney Cherubin, the director of legal services at the Brooklyn Volunteer Lawyers Project.

=== In support of proposals ===
The New York State Democratic Committee (Democratic Party) and Working Families Party campaigned in support of proposals 1, 3, and 4. The reason for the proposals' rejection, according to some sources, is in part because of the parties being "largely quiet on the measures".

=== Against proposals ===
The New York Republican State Committee (Republican Party) and Conservative Party of New York campaigned against proposals 1, 3, and 4 using the slogan "Just say no!". According to NPR, the reason for the rejection of the proposals can be linked to large campaigning by the two parties to reject the proposals.

=== Results ===
2021 New York State ballot proposal results
Question	For		Against		Total Votes	Result	Valid Ballots		Blank Ballots		Void Ballots		Total Ballots	Registered Voters	Turnout
Question	Votes	%	Votes	%	Total Votes	Result	Votes	%	Votes	%	Votes	%	Total Ballots	Registered Voters	Turnout
Proposal 1: Make Various Changes to Redistricting Process	1,361,043	45.62%	1,622,195	54.38%	2,983,238	Rejected	2,983,238	86.69%	456,841	13.28%	1,031	0.03%	3,441,110	12,318,347	27.93%
Proposal 2: Right to Clean Air, Water, and Healthful Environment	2,129,051	70.12%	907,159	29.88%	3,036,210	Passed	3,036,210	88.23%	404,006	11.74%	894	0.03%	3,441,110	12,318,347	27.93%
Proposal 3: Allow Legislature to Pass Same-Day Voter Registration	1,336,327	43.70%	1,721,811	56.30%	3,058,138	Rejected	3,058,138	88.87%	381,520	11.09%	1,452	0.04%	3,441,110	12,318,347	27.93%
Proposal 4: Allow Legislature to Pass No-Excuse Absentee Voting	1,370,897	44.97%	1,677,580	55.03%	3,048,477	Rejected	3,048,477	88.59	391,133	11.37%	1,500	0.04%	3,441,110	12,318,347	27.93%
Proposal 5: Raise New York City Civil Court Limit to Claim	1,874,515	64.06%	1,051,803	35.94%	2,926,318	Passed	2,926,318	85.04%	514,210	14.94%	582	0.02%	3,441,110	12,318,347	27.93%

Proposals 2 (Right to Clean Air, Water, and Healthful Environment) and 5 (New York Civil Court Limit) passed, while proposals 1 (Redistricting), 3 (Voter Registration), and 4 (Absentee Voting) were rejected.

2021 ballot proposal results by county

New York 2021 Proposal 1 results by county

New York 2021 Proposal 2 results by county

New York 2021 Proposal 3 results by county

New York 2021 Proposal 4 results by county

New York 2021 Proposal 5 results by county

== State legislature ==
=== State Senate District 30 ===
2021 State Senate District 30 Special General Election
Party	Candidate	Votes	%
New York Democratic Party	Cordell Cleare	39,931	88.61%
New York Republican Party	Oz Sultan	2,707	6.01%
Independent	Shana Harmongoff	2,427	5.39%
Total		45,065	100%

== State Supreme Court ==
=== District 1 ===
In District 1, two winners are allowed.

2021 District 1, State Supreme Court General Election
Party	Candidate	Votes	%
New York Democratic Party	Margaret A. Pui Yee Chan	185,005	38.41%
New York Democratic Party	John Joseph Kelley	153,432	31.85%
Total		338,437	100%

=== District 2 ===
In District 2, seven winners are allowed.

2021 District 2, State Supreme Court General Election
Party	Candidate	Votes	%
New York Democratic Party	Consuelo Melendez	234,195	14.51%
New York Democratic Party	Gina Abadi	230,324	14.27%
New York Democratic Party	Lillian Wan	229,226	14.2%
New York Democratic Party	Joy Campanelli	227,398	14.09%
New York Democratic Party	Richard Montelione	221,392	13.72%
New York Democratic Party	Dena Douglas	207,065	12.83%
New York Democratic Party	Carolyn Walker-Diallo	197,776	12.25%
New York Republican Party	Robert Mazzuchin	66,517	4.12%
Total		1,613,893	100%

=== District 3 ===
In District 3, three winners are allowed.

2021 District 3, State Supreme Court General Election
Party	Candidate	Votes	%
New York Democratic Party	Kevin R. Bryant	88,236	19.21%
Working Families Party	Kevin R. Bryant	27,434	4.56%
Total	Kevin R. Bryant	115,670	19.21%
New York Democratic Party	Laura M. Jordan	87,730	14.57%
Working Families Party	Laura M. Jordan	27,367	4.54%
Total	Laura M. Jordan	115,097	19.11%
New York Democratic Party	David M. Gandin	81,126	13.47%
Working Families Party	David M. Gandin	25,713	4.27%
Total		337,606	100%

=== District 5 ===
2021 District 5, State Supreme Court General Election
Party	Candidate	Votes	%
New York Democratic Party	Anthony J. Brindisi	76,640	44.16%
New York Republican Party	Danielle Fogel	96,926	55.84%
Total		173,566	100%

=== District 6 ===
In District 6, three winners are allowed.

2021 District 6, State Supreme Court General Election
Party	Candidate	Votes	%
New York Democratic Party	Molly Fitzgerald	51,186	14.16
New York Republican Party	Elizabeth Aherne	61,596	16.10%
New York Republican Party	Patrick J. O'Sullivan	66,078	17.27%
Total		178,860	100%

=== District 7 ===
In District 7, two winners are allowed.

2021 District 7, State Supreme Court General Election
Party	Candidate	Votes	%
New York Democratic Party	Maurice Verrillo	81,191	19.35%
New York Democratic Party	Deral Givens	76,065	18.13%
New York Republican Party	Elena Cariola	131,765	31.41%
New York Republican Party	Jim Walsh	130,542	31.11%
Total		419,563	100%

=== District 8 ===
In District 8, four winners are allowed. Rather unusually, the New York Democratic, Republican, Working Families and Conservative parties all endorsed the same justices.

2021 District 8, State Supreme Court General Election
Party	Candidate	Votes	%
New York Democratic Party	Grace M. Hanlon	92,346	7.94
New York Republican Party	Grace M. Hanlon	103,076	8.86%
Conservative Party of New York	Grace M. Hanlon	30,357	2.61%
Working Families Party	Grace M. Hanlon	10,157	0.87%
Total	Grace M. Hanlon	235,936	20.28%
New York Democratic Party	John B. Licata	84,191	7.24%
New York Republican Party	John B. Licata	101,752	8.75%
Conservative Party of New York	John B. Licata	30,765	2.64%
Working Families Party	John B. Licata	9,805	0.84%
Total	John B. Licata	226,513	19.47%
New York Democratic Party	Frank Caruso	87,715	7.54%
New York Republican Party	Frank Caruso	101,789	8.75%
Conservative Party of New York	Frank Caruso	32,876	2.83%
Total	Frank Caruso	222,380	19.11%
New York Democratic Party	Raymond W. Walter	86,410	7.43%
New York Republican Party	Raymond W. Walter	99,269	8.53%
Conservative Party of New York	Raymond W. Walter	32,164	2.76%
Total	Raymond W. Walter	217,843	18.72%
Total		902,672	100%

=== District 9 ===
In District 9, five winners are allowed.

2021 District 9, State Supreme Court General Election
Party	Candidate	Votes	%
New York Democratic Party	James L. Hyer	146,302	8.31%
Conservative Party of New York	James L. Hyer	23,365	1.33%
Total	James L. Hyer	169,667	9.63%
New York Democratic Party	Robert M. Berliner	142,427	8.09%
New York Republican Party	Robert M. Berliner	117,180	6.65%
Conservative Party of New York	Robert M. Berliner	24,957	1.42%
Total	Robert M. Berliner	284,564	16.15%
New York Democratic Party	Christie L. D'Alessio	154,873	8.79%
Conservative Party of New York	Christie L. D'Alessio	27,787	1.58%
Total	Christie L. D'Alessio	182,660	10.37%
New York Democratic Party	Thomas Quinones	149,807	8.50%
Conservative Party of New York	Thomas Quinones	25,571	1.45%
Total	Thomas Quinones	175,378	9.96%
New York Democratic Party	Thomas R. Davis	148,679	8.44%
New York Republican Party	Thomas R. Davis	124,270	7.05%
Total	Thomas R. Davis	272,949	15.50%
New York Republican Party	Richard J. Guertin	110,568	6.28%
Conservative Party of New York	Richard J. Guertin	24,778	1.41%
Total	Richard J. Guertin	135,346	7.68%
New York Republican Party	James M. Hendry III	120,392	6.83%
New York Republican Party	Mark T. Starkman	117,717	6.68%
Total		1,458,673	100%

=== District 10 ===
In District 10, eight winners are allowed.

2021 District 10, State Supreme Court General Election
Party	Candidate	Votes	%
New York Democratic Party	Timothy S. Driscoll	186,707	4.33%
New York Republican Party	Timothy S. Driscoll	240,181	5.57%
Conservative Party of New York	Timothy S. Driscoll	54,869	1.27%
Total	Timothy S. Driscoll	481,757	11.17%
New York Democratic Party	Susan B. Heckman	182,076	4.22%
New York Republican Party	Susan B. Heckman	234,204	5.43%
Conservative Party of New York	Susan B. Heckman	54,166	1.26%
Total	Susan B. Heckman	470,446	10.91%
New York Democratic Party	Vito M. DeStefano	178,428	4.14%
New York Republican Party	Vito M. DeStefano	235,369	5.46%
Conservative Party of New York	Vito M. DeStefano	55,675	1.29%
Total	Vito M. DeStefano	469,472	10.88%
New York Democratic Party	Christopher Modelewski	176,481	4.09%
New York Republican Party	Christopher Modelewski	231,026	5.36%
Conservative Party of New York	Christopher Modelewski	53,621	1.24%
Total	Christopher Modeleweski	461,498	10.70%
New York Democratic Party	Conrad D. Singer	177,197	4.11%
New York Republican Party	Conrad D. Singer	229,158	5.31%
Conservative Party of New York	Conrad D. Singer	53,621	1.24%
Total	Conrad D. Singer	459,976	10.66%
New York Democratic Party	Danielle M. Peterson	179,013	4.15%
New York Republican Party	Danielle M. Peterson	230,521	5.34%
Conservative Party of New York	Danielle M. Peterson	54,348	1.26%
Total	Danielle M. Peterson	463,882	10.75
New York Democratic Party	Eileen Daly Sapraicone	179,249	4.16%
New York Republican Party	Eileen Daly Sapraicone	229,904	5.33%
Conservative Party of New York	Eileen Daly Sapraicone	54,228	1.26%
Total	Eileen Daly Sapraicone	463,381	10.74%
New York Democratic Party	Elizabeth M. Fox-McDonough	179,786	4.17%
New York Republican Party	Elizabeth M. Fox-McDonough	230,213	5.34%
Conservative Party of New York	Elizabeth M. Fox-McDonough	54,093	1.25%
Total	Elizabeth M. Fox-McDonough	464,092	10.76%
Total		3,734,504	100%

=== District 11 ===
In District 11, six winners are allowed.

2021 District 11, State Supreme Court General Election
Party	Candidate	Votes	%
New York Democratic Party	Denis J. Butler	125,297	8.12%
New York Republican Party	Denis J. Butler	68,234	4.42%
Total	Denis J. Butler	193,531	12.55%
New York Democratic Party	Kenneth C. Holder	109,244	7.08%
New York Republican Party	Kenneth C. Holder	58,095	3.77%
Total	Kenneth C. Holder	167,339	10.85%
New York Democratic Party	David J. Kirschner	113,386	7.35%
New York Republican Party	David J. Kirschner	59,839	3.88%
Total	David J. Kirschner	173,225	11.23%
New York Democratic Party	Laurentina S. McKetney Butler	132,144	8.57%
New York Democratic Party	Karen Gopee	120,061	7.78%
New York Democratic Party	Michele R. Titus	130,740	8.48%
New York Republican Party	John C. Spataro	66,454	4.31%
Working Families Party	Deborah Axt	29,583	1.92%
Working Families Party	Bob Cohen	28,215	1.83%
Total			100%

=== District 12 ===
In District 12, five winners are allowed.

2021 District 12, State Supreme Court General Election
Party	Candidate	Votes	%
New York Democratic Party	George R. Villegas	64,134	10.69%
New York Democratic Party	Patsy D. Gouldborne	54,098	9.02%
New York Democratic Party	Paul L. Alpert	55,459	9.24%
New York Democratic Party	Marissa Soto	69,210	11.53%
New York Democratic Party	Naita A. Semaj	51,836	8.64%
New York Republican Party	Anthony G. Marecki	20,657	3.44%
Total		315,394	100%

=== District 13 ===
2021 District 13, State Supreme Court General Election
Party	Candidate	Votes	%
New York Democratic Party	Ann Thompson	29,087	14.54%
New York Democratic Party	Charles M. Troia	24,775	12.39%
New York Republican Party	Paul Marrone Jr.	60,746	30.37%
New York Republican Party	Ronald Castorina Jr.	56,778	28.38%
Total		171,386	100%

== Mayoral elections ==
A number of places throughout the state held mayoral elections.

=== Albany mayoral election ===
2021 Albany mayoral election
Party	Candidate	Votes	%
New York Democratic Party	Kathy Sheehan (Incumbent)	7,942	64.09%
New York Republican Party	Alicia Purdy	2,245	18.12%
Independent	Greg Aidala	2,204	17.79%
Total		12,391	100%

=== Buffalo mayoral election ===
2021 Buffalo mayoral election
Party	Candidate	Votes	%
Write-In (Democrat)	Byron W. Brown (Incumbent)	38,338	59.57%
New York Democratic Party	India B. Walton	25,773	39.88%
Write-In	Others	250	0.39%
Total		64,361	100%

=== Glen Cove mayoral election ===
2021 Glen Cove mayoral election
Party	Candidate	Votes	%
New York Democratic Party	Timothy Tenke (incumbent)	2,347	42.87%
New York Republican Party	Pamela Panzenbeck	3,112	56.84%
Total		5,459	100%

=== New York City mayoral election ===
2021 New York City mayoral election
Party	Candidate	Votes	%
New York Democratic Party	Eric Adams	676,481	66.5%
New York Republican Party	Curtis Sliwa	293,127	28.8%
Party for Socialism and Liberation	Catherine Rojas	24,995	2.5%
Conservative Party of New York	William Pepitone	11,668	1.1%
Empowerment Party	Quanda Francis	3,462	0.3%
Libertarian Party of New York	Stacey Prussman	2,830	0.3%
Humanity United Party	Raja Flores	2,155	0.2%
Save Our City Party	Fernando Mateo	1,695	0.2%
Out Lawbreaker Party	Skiboky Stora	250	<0.1%
Total		1,016,663	100%

=== Peekskill mayoral election ===
2021 Peekskill mayoral election
Party	Candidate	Votes	%
New York Democratic Party	Vivian C. McKenzie	2,374	64%
Working Families Party	Conor A. Greene	144	4%
New York Republican Party	Emiliano D. Perez	1,048	28%
New York Conservative Party	Emiliano D. Perez	163	4%
Total	Emiliano D. Perez	1,211	32%
Total		3,729	100%

=== Rochester mayoral election ===
2021 Rochester mayoral election results
Party	Candidate	Votes	%
Democratic	Malik Evans	15,513	98.57%
Write-in		225	1.43%
Total votes		15,738	100
Democratic hold			

=== Rye mayoral election ===
2021 City of Rye mayoral election
Party	Candidate	Votes	%
New York Democratic Party	Joshua D. Cohn (incumbent)	1,537	48%
New York Republican Party	Joshua D. Cohn	2,136	36%
Total	Joshua D. Cohn	2,673	84%
Working Families Party	Danielle T. Epstein	503	16%
Total		3,176	100%

=== Suffern mayoral election ===
2021 Village of Suffern mayoral election
Party	Candidate	Votes	%
New York Democratic Party	Michael F. Curley	1,018	44.57%
Working Families Party	Michael F. Curley	184	8.06%
Total	Michael F. Curley	1,202	52.63%
New York Republican Party	Edward T. Markunas (incumbent)	904	39.58%
New York Conservative Party	Edward T. Markunas	177	7.75%
Total	Edward T. Markunas	1,081	47.33%
Write-in		1	0.04%
Total		3,174	100%

=== Syracuse mayoral election ===
General election
Party	Candidate	Votes	%
Independence	Ben Walsh (incumbent)	10,987	61%
Democratic	Khalid Bey	4,923	27%
Republican	Janet Burman	2,144	11.84%
Total votes		18,054	100%

== County executives ==
Several counties held county executive elections.

=== Nassau County ===
2021 Nassau County Executive election
Party	Candidate	Votes	%
New York Democratic Party	Laura Curran (Incumbent)	140,489	49.59%
New York Republican Party	Bruce Blakeman	142,635	50.35%
Total		283,279	100%

=== Rensselaer County ===
2021 Rensselaer County Executive election
Party	Candidate	Votes	%
New York Democratic Party	Gwen Wright	13,131	34.01%
New York Republican Party	Steven F. McLaughlin (incumbent)	19,315	50.03%
New York Conservative Party	Steven F. McLaughlin	5,002	12.96%
Total	Steven F. McLaughlin	24,317	62.99%
Working Families Party	Sara J. McDermott	1,141	2.96%
Write-in		16	0.04%
Total		38,605	100%

=== Rockland County ===
2021 Rockland County Executive election
Party	Candidate	Votes	%
New York Democratic Party	L'Tanya M. Watkins	11,786	24.98%
Working Families Party	L'Tanya M. Watkins	1,112	2.36%
Total	L'Tanya M. Watkins	12,898	27.33%
New York Republican Party	Ed Day (incumbent)	27,387	58.04%
New York Conservative Party	Ed Day	6,790	14.39%
Total	Ed Day	34,177	72.43%
Write-in		110	0.23%
Total		47,185	100%

=== Westchester County ===
2021 Westchester Executive election
Party	Candidate	Votes	%
New York Democratic Party	George S. Latimer (incumbent)	92,034	58%
Working Families Party	George S. Latimer	5,719	4%
Total	George S. Latimer	97,753	62%
New York Republican Party	Christine Sculti	58,325	37%
New York Conservative Party	Christine Sculti	1,999	1%
Total	Christine Sculti	60,324	38%
Total		158,077	100%

== See also ==
- Elections in New York (state)
- Bilingual elections requirement for New York (per Voting Rights Act Amendments of 2006)
