= 2021 Maine Question 3 =

- Right to Produce, Harvest, and Consume Food Amendment

Results
Choice	Votes	%
Yes	249,273	60.84%
No	160,440	39.16%
Total votes	409,713	100.00%
- Yes 50–60% 60–70%

Maine Question 3, the Right to Produce, Harvest, and Consume Food Amendment, was on the ballot in Maine as a proposed constitutional amendment on November 2, 2021. As required by the Maine Constitution, it passed the Maine Legislature by a 2/3 vote. The proposed amendment was intended to make it a state right to produce, grow, harvest and raise food as long as the individual producing the food does not commit abuses to the land, poaching, theft or trespassing. It was approved in the November 2021 Maine elections. Supporters of the amendment included State Sen. Craig Hickman, State Rep. Billy Bob Faulkingham, State Rep. Jonathan Connor, State Rep. Michelle Dunphy, State Rep. Justin Fecteau, State Sen. David Miramant and State Rep. Laurel Libby. Opponents of the amendment included Animal Rights Maine, the Maine Veterinary Medical Association, Maine Friends of Animals, the Maine Potato Board and the Maine Farm Bureau.

== Contents ==
The amendment appeared on the ballot as follows:

"Do you favor amending the Constitution of Maine to declare that all individuals have a natural, inherent and unalienable right to grow, raise, harvest, produce and consume the food of their own choosing for their own nourishment, sustenance, bodily health and well-being?"

== Judicial action ==
The Maine Supreme Judicial Court ruled on March 28, 2024 that Maine's ban of hunting on Sundays does not violate this amendment, as it specifies that poaching is not permitted. This means that the amendment does not extend to "situations in which hunting is illegal".

== Results ==
Right to Produce, Harvest, and Consume Food
Choice	Votes	%
For	249,273	60.84
Against	160,440	39.16
Total	409,713	100.00

Question 3 results by county Yes 50–60% 60–70%
