= Wolmirstedt substation =

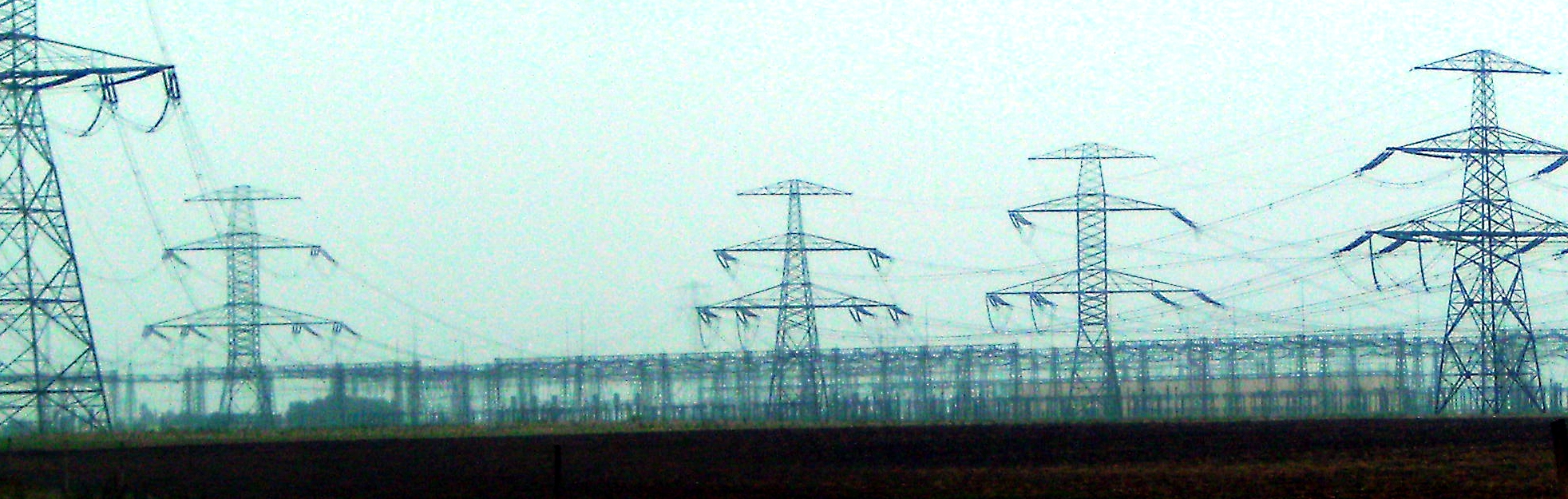
Wolmirstedt 380 kV-substation

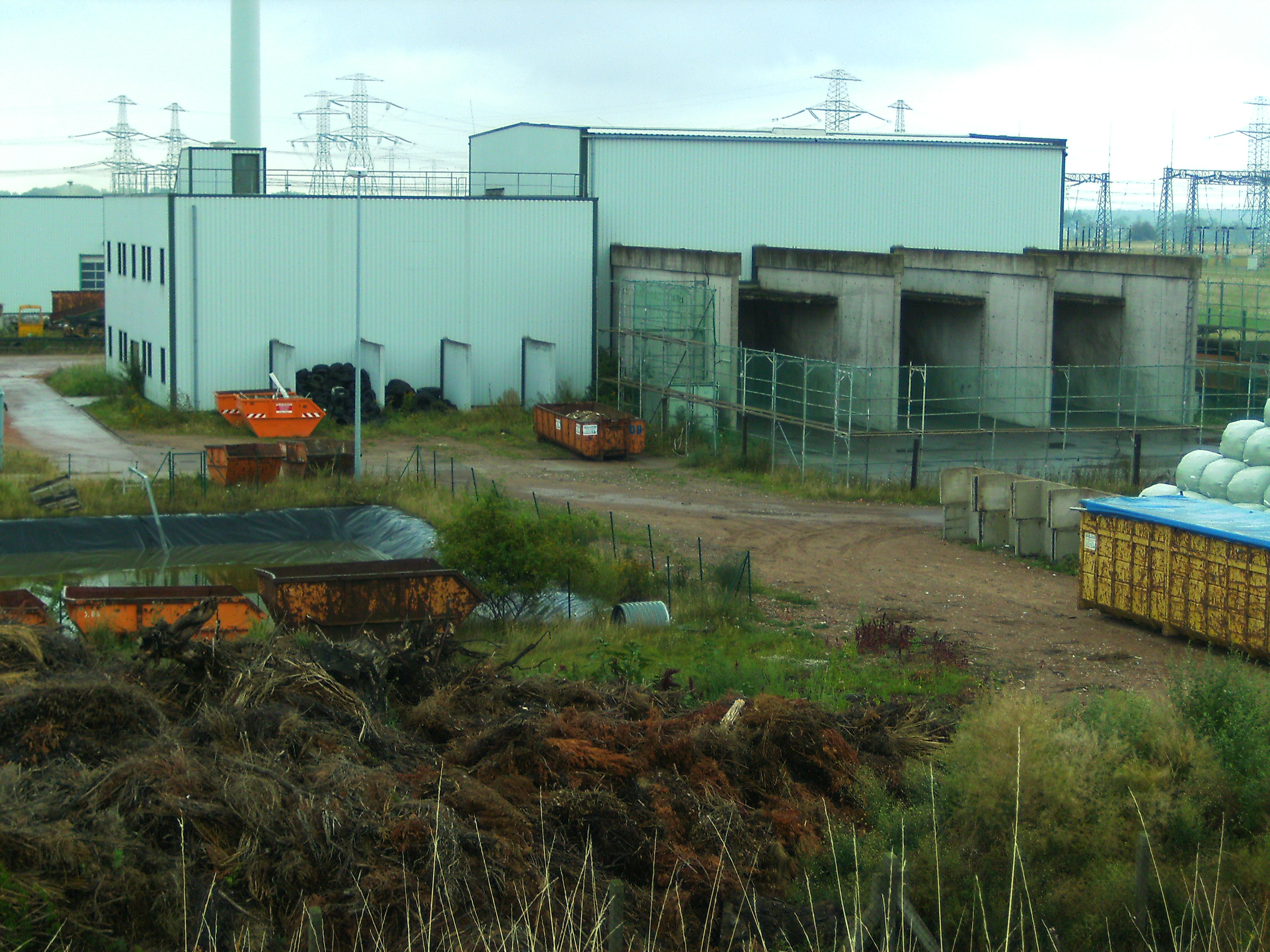
View from West onto the static inverter hall of never realized Wolmirstedt HVDC-back-to-back plant. One can see clearly the transformer bays. The building is today part of Farsleben Recycling Yard

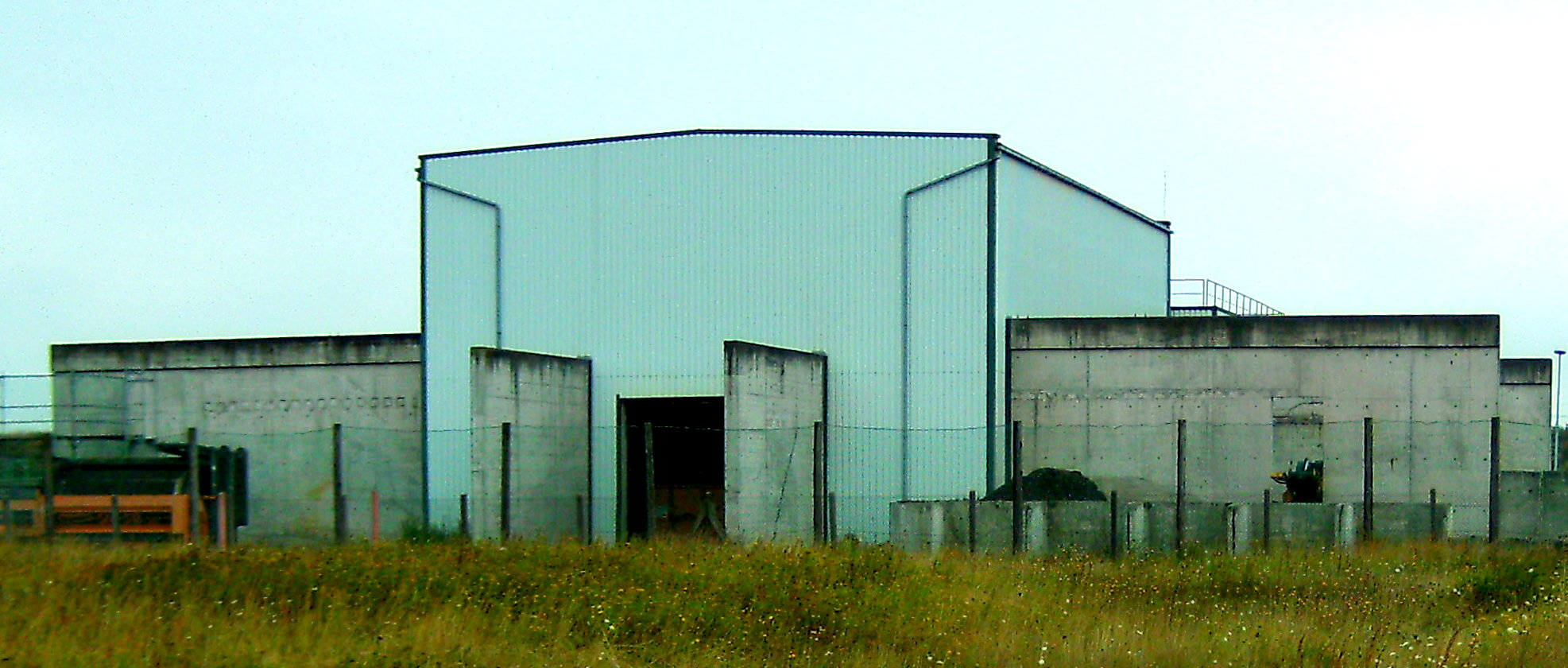
View from South onto the static inverter hall of never realized Wolmirstedt HVDC-back-to-back plant. Between the concrete walls the installation of smooth reactor was planned. The concrete way with rails in the foreground runs to Wolmirstedt substation and was built for transportation of heavy equipment

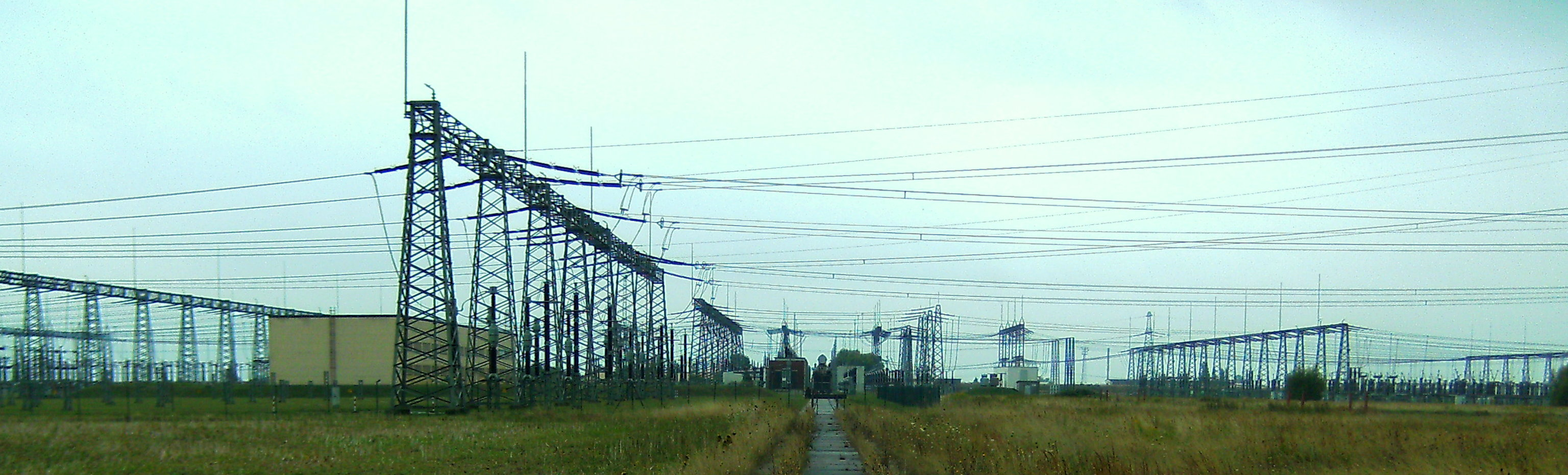
The concrete way running from Wolmirstedt substation to static inverter hall

Wolmirstedt substation (German: Umspannwerk Wolmirstedt) is a large node in the power grid of former East Germany and termination of Germany's longest powerline, running from Lubmin nuclear power station to Wolmirstedt substation.

Via Wolmirstedt substation the first power exchange between both parts of Germany took place. On October 3, 1989, the 380 kV powerline between Helmstedt and Wolmirstedt substation went in service. This line was the first section of the 380 kV powerline between former West Germany and former West-Berlin, which went in service in 1994, one year later as planned in the mid 1980s.

As power grids between former GDR and former West Germany were not synchronized until 1993, power exchange between both systems were much limited.

In order to allow a full power exchange already in the 1980s the construction of an HVDC-back-to-back station at Wolmirstedt was planned. At the beginning of 1989 construction work on this facility, whose inauguration was planned in 1992, started. However it was decided after opening of Inter-German Border to synchronize the power grids of East- and West-Germany, in order not to require expensive HVDC systems with their limiting transmission rate. For this reason construction work on Wolmirstedt HVDC-back-to-back station, which was designed to allow a maximum power exchange of 600 MW by using a DC voltage of 160 kV, was stopped in April 1990. At this time of point the static inverter hall, situated at 52°16'21" N and 11°38'10" E, was already built. Also an earth wall for the protection of the inhabitants of Mose, an urban part of Wolmirstedt, and the road equipped with a rail running to Wolmirstedt substation for delivering the electrical equipment was already completed.

In opposite to the HVDC-back-to-back facilities in Etzenricht, Dürnrohr and Vienna, which were on both sites connected to the corresponding 380 kV-grids, it was planned at Wolmirstedt HVDC back-to-back plant only to realize the connection to the West German powergrid on the 380 kV-level. The link to the East German power grid was planned to be realized on the 220 kV-level as the grid for this voltage level was in former Eastern Germany at those days much stronger than that of the 380 kV-level.

The static inverter hall was, because of its noise protection wall, sold after termination of construction work to a company doing glass recycling and is today part of Farsleben Recycling Yard. The components designed for the realization of Wolmirstedt HVDC back-to-back station were - except of the inverter transformers planned for the connection of the inverter to the East German 220 kV-grid, for which no demand existed and were scrapped afterwards - used at Etzenricht HVDC-back-to-back station.

Currently, a converter is being built at the substation with a capacity of 2 gigawatts.
