= Dürnrohr =

Coordinates: 48°20′N 15°54′E

Dürnrohr is a village in Austria, which belongs to Zwentendorf, Lower Austria, Austria.

== See also ==
- Dürnrohr Power Station, a coal-fired power station close to Dürnrohr
- GK Dürnrohr, a decommissioned HVDC back-to-back station, which played before 1996 an important role in the transmission system of Europe
- Dürnrohr Waste Incineration Plant, a waste incineration plant close to Dürnrohr Power Station
