= Slavětice =

- Municipality
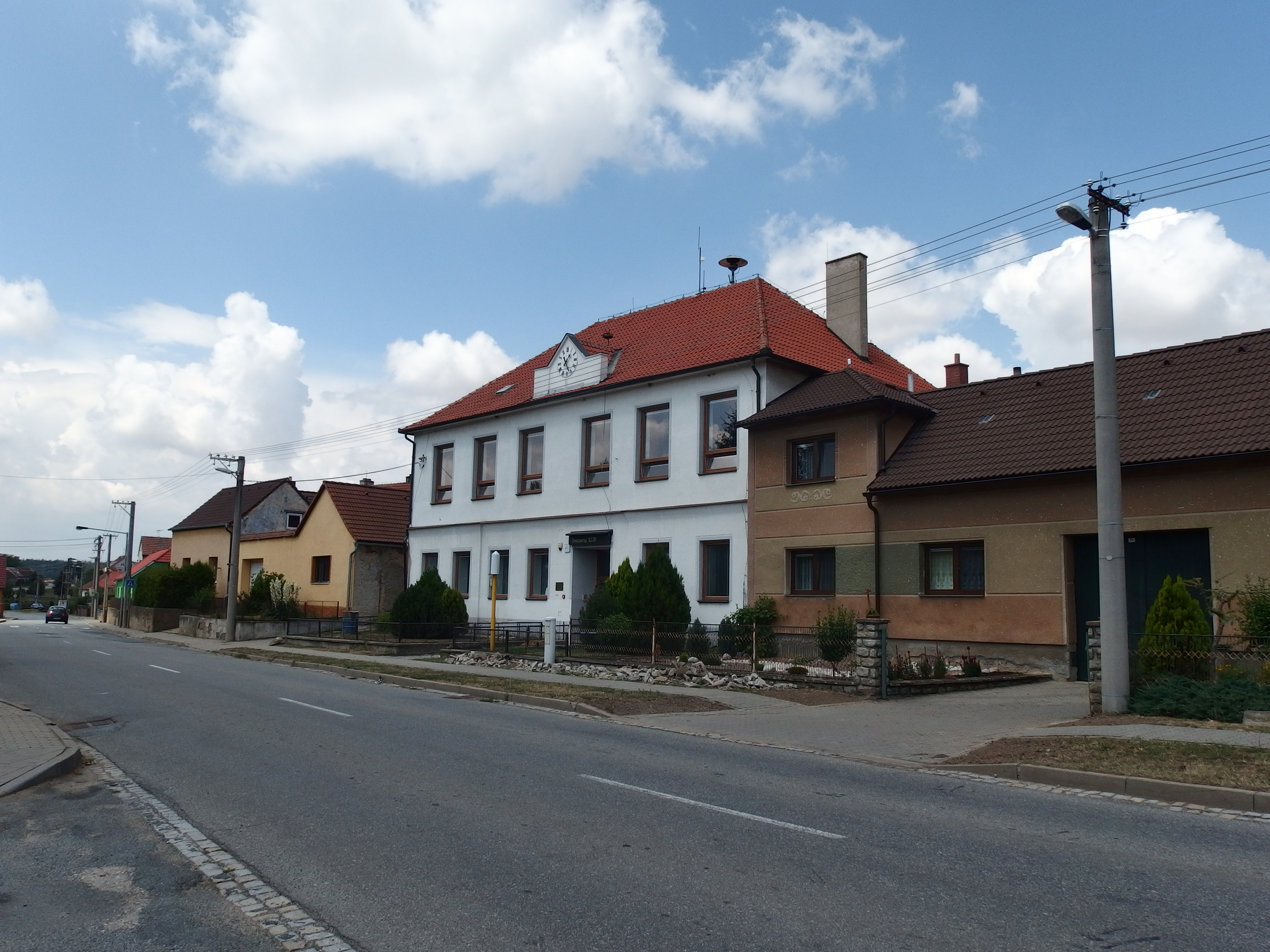
- Former school

- Flag Coat of arms

- Location in the Czech Republic
- Coordinates: 49°6′13″N 16°6′31″E
- Country: Czech Republic
- Region: Vysočina
- District: Třebíč
- First mentioned: 1353

Area
  - Total: 9.50 km^{2} (3.67 sq mi)
- Elevation: 384 m (1,260 ft)

Population (2026-01-01)
  - Total: 214
  - Density: 22.5/km^{2} (58.3/sq mi)
- Time zone: UTC+1 (CET)
  - Summer (DST): UTC+2 (CEST)
- Postal code: 675 55
- Website: www.slavetice.eu

Slavětice is a municipality and village in Třebíč District in the Vysočina Region of the Czech Republic. It has about 200 inhabitants.

Slavětice lies approximately 22 kilometres (14 mi) south-east of Třebíč, 50 km (31 mi) south-east of Jihlava, and 164 km (102 mi) south-east of Prague.

== Demographics ==
Historical population
Year	Pop.	±%
1869	384	—
1880	356	−7.3%
1890	387	+8.7%
1900	402	+3.9%
1910	398	−1.0%
1921	460	+15.6%
1930	417	−9.3%
1950	386	−7.4%
1961	396	+2.6%
1970	347	−12.4%
1980	332	−4.3%
1991	255	−23.2%
2001	238	−6.7%
2011	242	+1.7%
2021	217	−10.3%
Source: Censuses
