= Valve hall =

Building containing the valves of static inverters of a HVDC plant

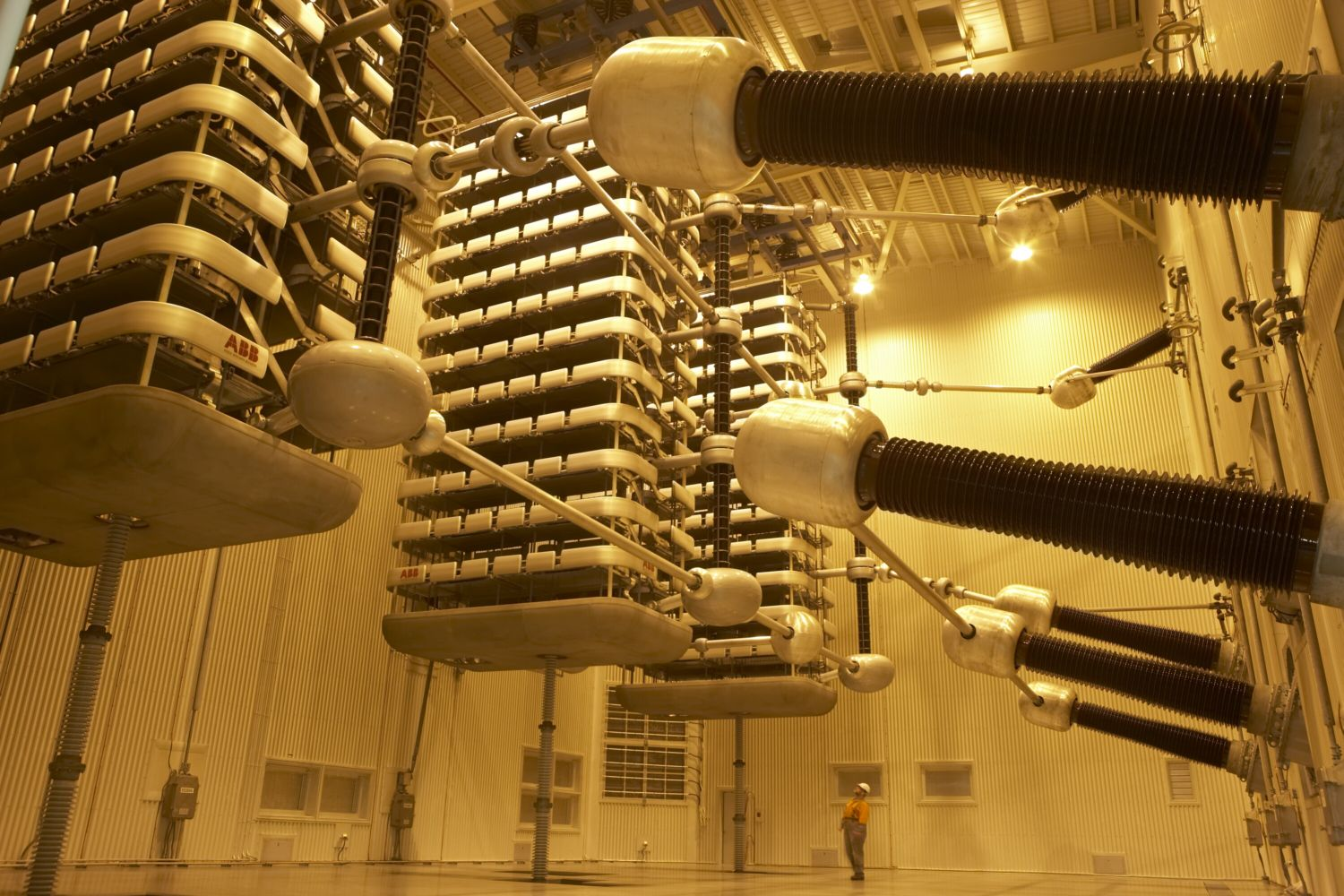
HVDC Pole 2 thyristor valve hall at Haywards in the New Zealand HVDC Inter-Island scheme

A valve hall is a building which contains the valves of the static inverters of a high-voltage direct current plant. The valves consist of thyristors, or at older plants, mercury arc rectifiers. Mercury arc rectifiers are usually supported by insulators mounted on the floor, while thyristor valves may be either supported by insulators or hung from the roof of the valve hall. The latter requires a stronger ceiling structure, however, the hall and the static inverter can better survive earthquakes compared to valve structures standing on the floor.

A valve hall is equipped with heating and cooling equipment to control the temperature of the mercury arc rectifiers (which operate best over a narrow temperature range) or thyristors. The valve hall also protects the valves from weather and dust. Several valve assemblies, connected in a series for the required terminal voltage, may be installed in the valve hall building.

High voltage bushings are supported through the walls of the valve hall, to allow connections between the converter transformers on the one side and the DC switchyard on the other. Beside the valve hall there is often an additional building, in which are control electronics, equipment for valve cooling and valve monitoring, station service power distribution, and amenities for the plant workers.

Because of high voltages, access to the valve halls is limited while the static inverter is running. The auxiliary control building may have windows to observe the valve hall, but usually the converter is remotely controlled. To protect communication systems from electromagnetic interference, valve hall buildings must have shielding installed to control emission of radio-frequency energy.

At some HVDC converters such as at Cabora-Bassa, outdoor valves are installed in oil-immersed containers. At such plants no valve halls or wall bushings are required.

== See also ==
- High-voltage transformer fire barriers
