= GK Wien–Southeast =

Vienna-Southeast - Győr powerline
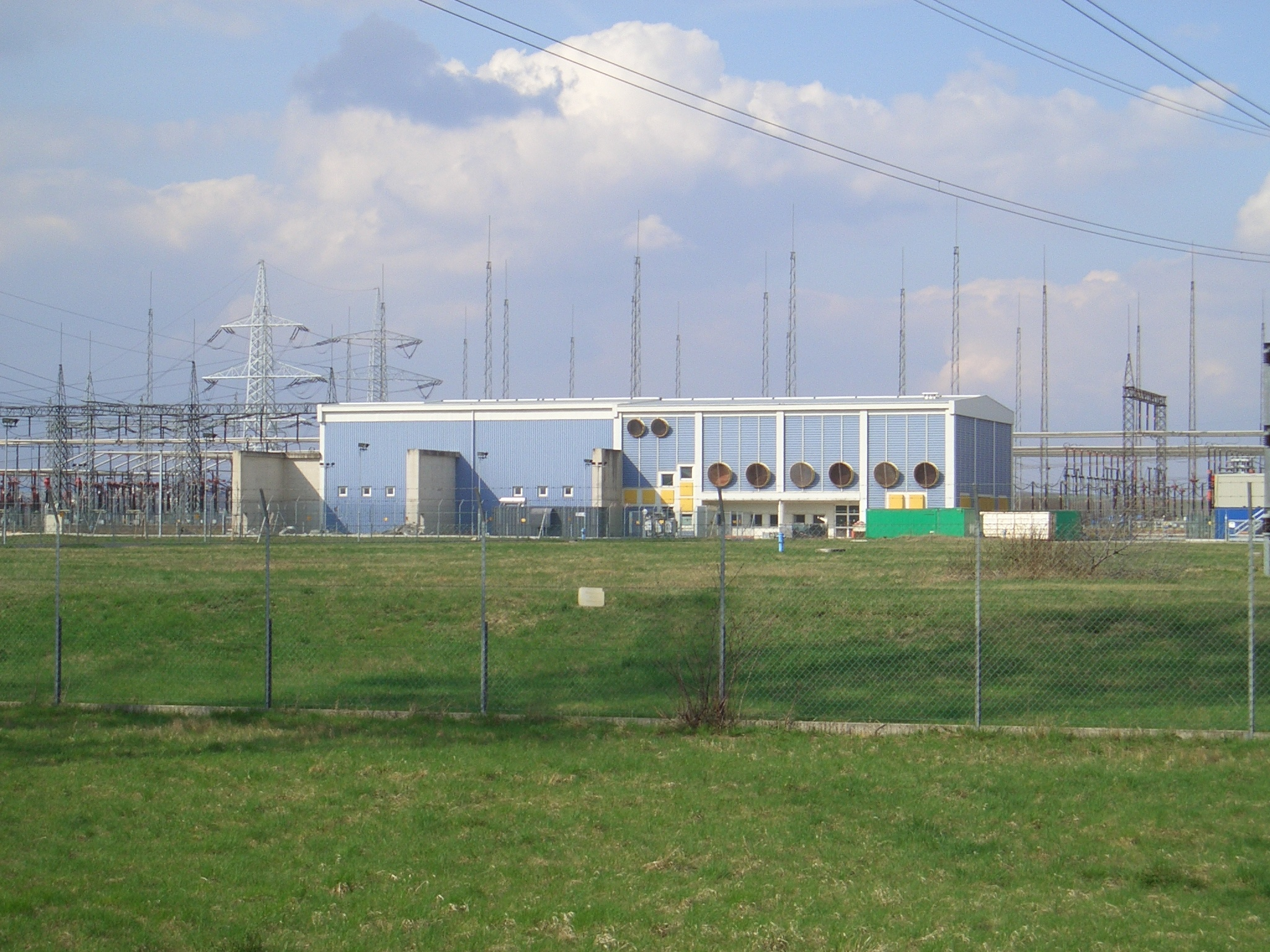
- Former Static Inverter Hall. On the left side the bays for the inverter transformers

Location
- Country: Austria, Hungary
- Coordinates: 48°07′22″N 16°25′06″E; 48°01′51″N 16°41′44″E; 47°55′17″N 17°6′32″E 47°43′2″N 17°28′58″E; 47°13′53″N 16°40′45″E 47°40′22″N 17°41′36″E
- General direction: east-west
- From: Vienna, Austria
- Passes through: Border of Hungary
- To: Győr, Hungary

Construction information
- Construction started: 1992
- Commissioned: 1993

Technical information
- Type: Overhead transmission line
- Current type: HVAC
- Total length: 123 km (76 mi)
- Capacity: 1,514 MW
- AC voltage: 380 kV
- No. of poles: 3
- No. of circuits: 2 ( originally 1)

The GK Vienna–Southeast was a back-to-back HVDC station linking the electric power grids of Austria and Hungary. It operated between June 1993 and October 1996.

== Facility ==
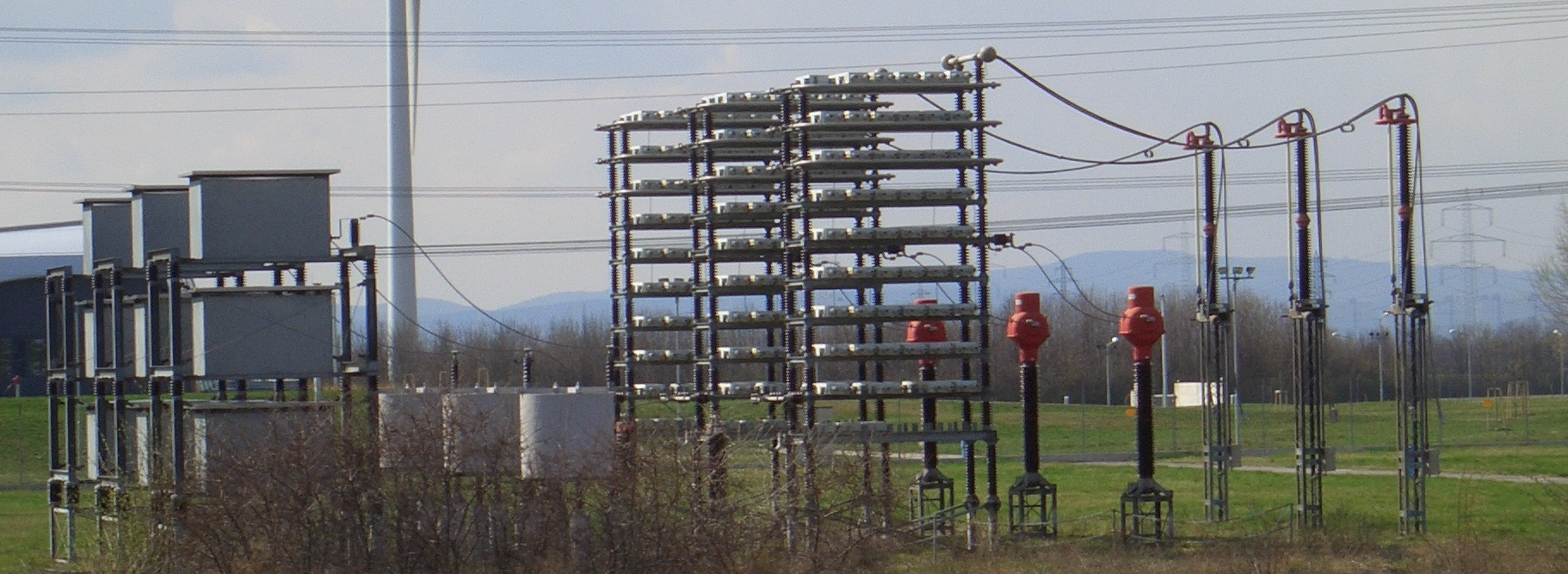
The former harmonic filter circuit on display

This facility was built by Siemens and had a maximum transfer power of 600 MW with an operation voltage of 142 kV. In great extent, it was identical with the HVDC back-to-back station in Etzenricht, which was used for coupling the power grids of Bavaria and Czech and built at the same time. As in this installation, the inverters used 864 thyristors. However, at GK Vienna-Southeast were not used as in the HVDC back-to-back station in Etzenricht six single-phase transformers, but four three-phase transformers. While the facility in Etzenricht got obsolete in 1995 after synchronisation of power grids in Western and Eastern Europe, GK Vienna-Southeast remained in service at first, because the direct interconnection of power grids of Austria and Hungary would have caused regulation-technical problems as result of the missing national 380 kV grid in Austria.

These problems were solved in 1996 with the installation of frequency regulation equipment in coal-fired power stations in Southern Poland, so GK Vienna Southeast GK got unessential in October 1996 and was shut down.

The shut-down of GK Vienna-Southeast increased the maximum transfer power of the 380 kV line Vienna southeast – Győr to 1514 MW.

After its shut-down, it was planned to dismantle GK Vienna-Southeast and rebuild it in East Europe at a location close to the border to the CIS countries for the realization of an interconnection between the power grid of central Europe and the CIS countries. However, that was not done and so the installation was dismantled in 2007–08.

However, one of the harmonic waves filter was preserved as a monument.

On the site, a new building for the control centre of the power grid of Austria was built. The static inverter hall was not demolished, but turned into a workshop.

At the third (before decommissioning of GK Wien–Southeast second) pylon, which is situated 260 metres south of the area of GK Wien–Southeast, the 26-kilometre-long line section starts, where it is together with the two 380 kV circuits of the powerline to Stixneusiedl substation installed on the same pylons. Stixneusiedl substation is passed by the line approximately 50 metres southwards. After a further 37.5 kilometres, the line passes the border to Hungary. At the beginning of 2010, the second 380 V circuit of the line was installed, for which the pylons of the whole line are already designed. This circuit branches near Ötteveny in direction southwest toward Szombathely substation.
