= Vyborg HVDC scheme =

System to transmit electricity from Russia to Finland

Vyborg back to back HVDC converter station

Location
- Country: Russia
- State: Leningrad Oblast
- Coordinates: 60°40′49″N 28°55′07″E
- From: Vyborg, Russia
- To: Finland

Ownership information
- Owner: Ministry for Electrotechnical Industry, Soviet Union

Construction information
- Substation installer: Ministry for Electrotechnical Industry, Soviet Union
- Commissioned: 1981–1984; 2001
- Decommissioned: 14 May 2022

Technical information
- Type: Back to Back
- Current type: HVDC
- Total length: 0 km (0 mi)
- Capacity: 4 x 355 MVA (4 x 250 MW)
- DC voltage: ±85 kV
- No. of poles: 4 (symmetrical monopoles)

The Vyborg HVDC scheme is a system of electricity transmission from the Russian power system to Finland, using high-voltage direct current. It consists of four 355 MVA (250 MW) back-to-back converter blocks, the first three of which were completed in the early 1980s and the last in January 2001. Much of the original converter equipment has been refurbished or modernised.

== History ==
Electricity transmission from the 330 kV Russian (then the Soviet Union) system to the 400 kV Finnish system started in 1981. As the Russian and Finnish power systems are asynchronous, a direct AC connection was not possible and a HVDC-back-to-back station was needed. It was decided to build the substation near Vyborg in the Leningrad region. The first unit of the substation was commissioned in December 1981 followed by the second unit in autumn 1982 and the third unit in summer 1984. The system was manufactured by the Ministry for Electrotechnical Industry of the USSR. A fourth unit was added in 2001 and the control and protection equipment of the three original poles has subsequently been modernised. In contrast to most other HVDC plants, its converters did not originally allow bidirectional energy to transfer, but only from Russia to the power grid of Finland. It was also the only back-to-back HVDC system in Russia and the only fully operational HVDC system in Russia, the others having either been shut down (Moscow–Kashira), never completed (Ekibastuz–Tambov) or are operated only at reduced capacity (Volgograd–Donbass).

On 13 May 2022, RAO Nordic released a statement saying they were halting the export of power to Finland due to lack of payment. Power transmission halted at 2200 GMT 13 May 2022. Eleven weeks before, Russia had started the invasion of Ukraine (see also Finland–Russia relations#2022–present).

== Technical description ==
The Vyborg substation is located 9 kilometres (5.6 mi) east of Vyborg at 60°40′49″N 28°55′07″E. It is connected with the Russian and Finnish high-voltage power systems. The substation is connected to the Russian power system with two 330 kV lines to Vostochnaya substation and with one line to Kamennogorskaya substation. It is connected with Finland with three 400 kV cross-border connections to Yllikkälä (two lines) and Kymi (one line) substations.

The substation consist of four independent, parallel symmetrical monopole (centre-grounded) back-to-back units, each rated 355 MVA and operating with a voltage of ± 85 kV. Each pole consists of a single Twelve-pulse bridge at each end and was built using thyristors from the outset. The first three poles were originally built using small (60 mm) diameter thyristors with three in parallel at each level, but these were later replaced by larger 80 mm thyristors which did not require parallel connection.

The converter transformers are of the relatively unusual single-phase, four-winding arrangement, with a 38.5 kV filter winding on which the tuned filters are connected. Other high-pass filters are connected directly to the 330 kV or 400 kV AC busbars. With a total transmission rating of 1000 MW, Vyborg was the world's largest HVDC-back-to-back facility until the 1800 MW Al-Fadhili facility was completed in Saudi Arabia in 2009.

== See also ==
- High-voltage direct current
- HVDC converter
- Moscow–Kashira HVDC transmission system
- HVDC Volgograd–Donbass
- HVDC Ekibastuz–Centre
