= Shock construction project =

Propaganda term for projects carried out by exceptionally productive worker brigades

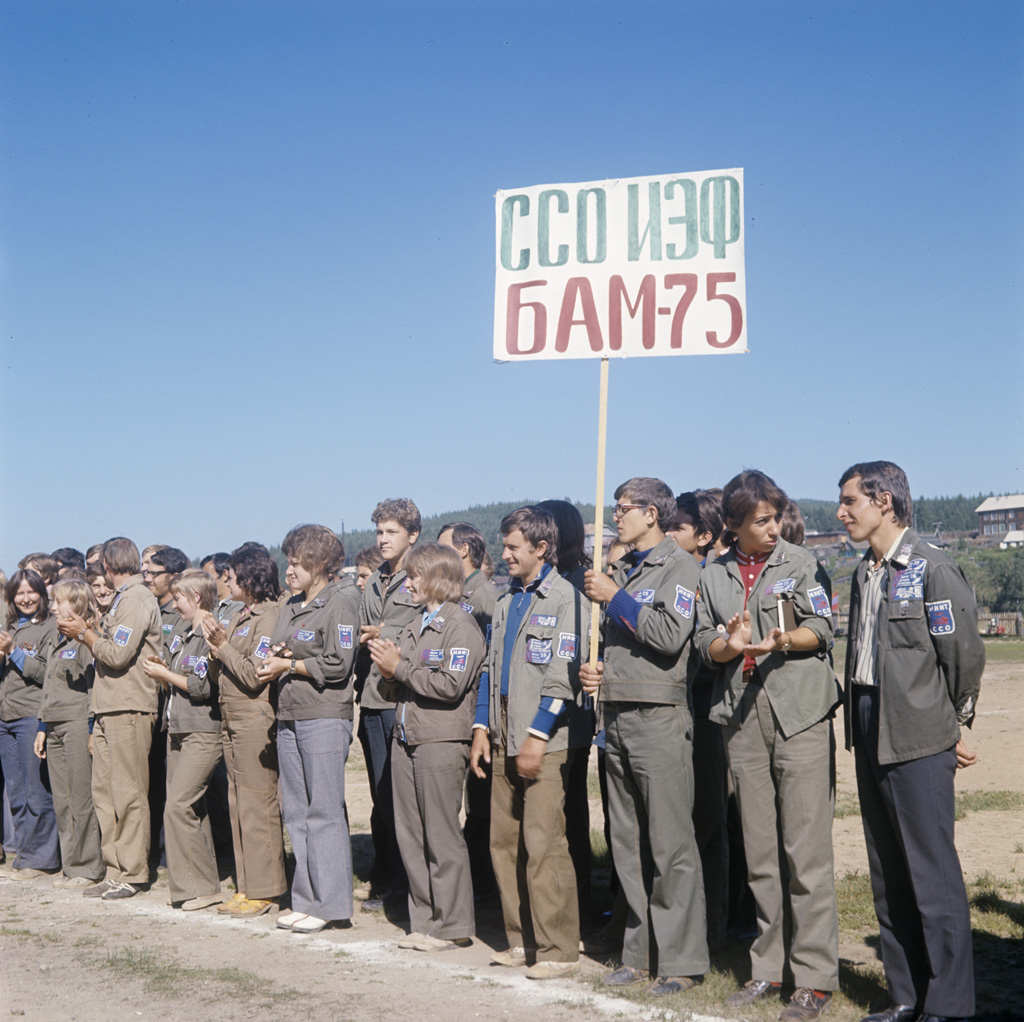
Student construction brigade at the shock construction project of Baikal–Amur Mainline

Shock construction projects (Russian: ударные стройки, romanized: udarnyye stroyki) also Komsomol shock construction projects was a Soviet propaganda term used for certain construction projects by Komsomol shock brigades in the Soviet Union.

Although often associated with Komsomol, shock construction projects in more general term also included the Great Construction Projects of Communism.

The first Komsomol shock construction project was announced for the blast furnace #2 (later became known as "Komsomolskaya") at the Magnitogorsk Iron and Steel Works in 1930–32. The last construction project was an air converting rolling mill for hot rolling at the same Magnitogorsk Iron and Steel Works in 1986–90.

The hire of volunteers for the projects was conducted in a framework of the state system of organizational mobilization, but more often through Komsomol mobilization by Komsomol travel tickets. One of active participants of the 1950s-80s construction projects were student construction brigades under a patronage of Komsomol. In 1980s the status of regional shock construction projects was granted to Youth Residential Complexes (MZhK).
