= Vockerode =

- Ortsteil of Oranienbaum-Wörlitz
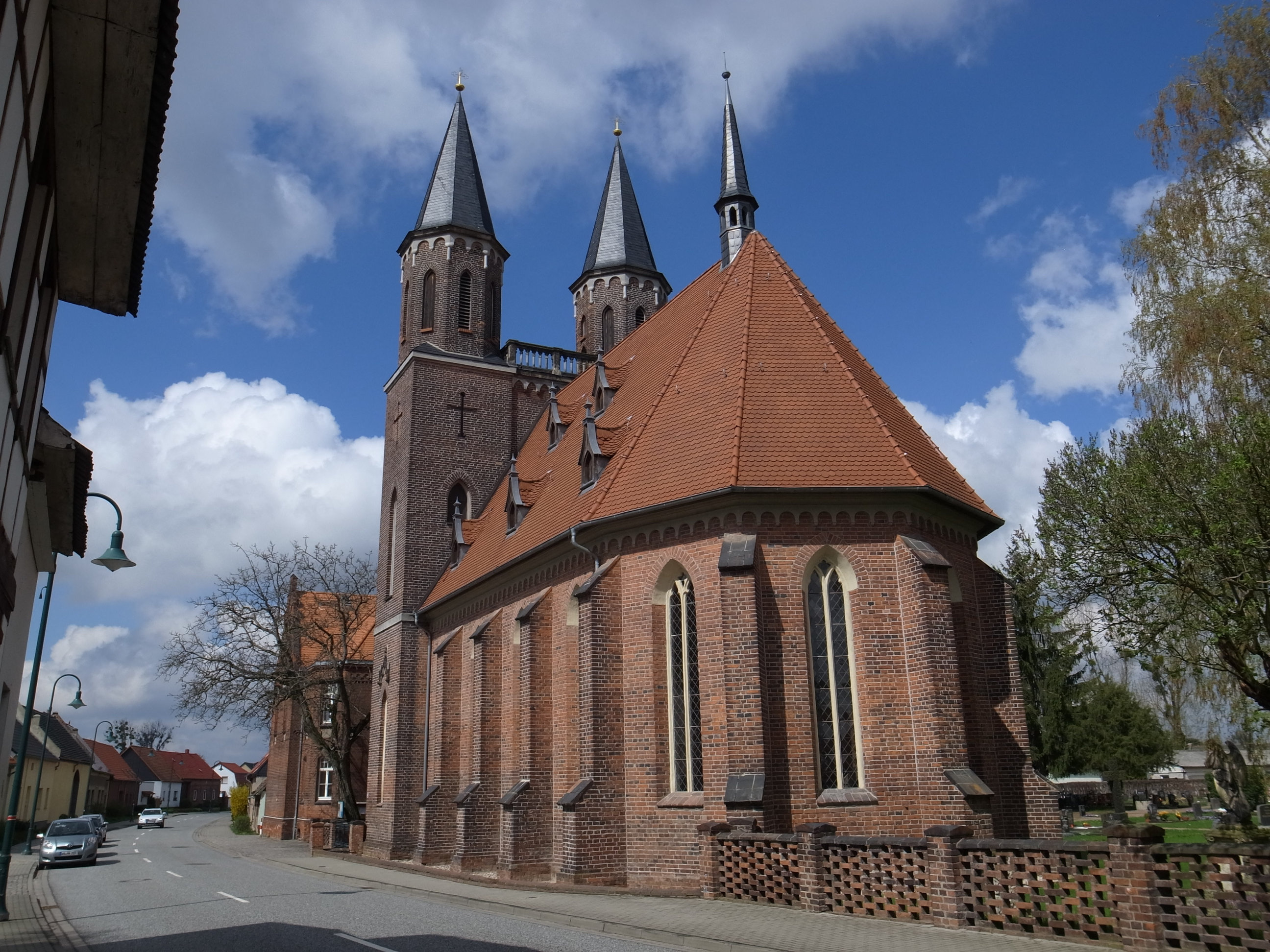

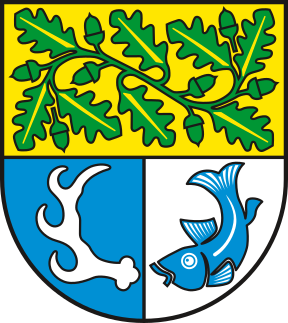
- Coat of arms
- Interactive map of Vockerode
- Location within Germany Location within Saxony-Anhalt
- Coordinates: 51°50′43″N 12°21′5″E
- Country: Germany
- State: Saxony-Anhalt
- District: Wittenberg
- Town: Oranienbaum-Wörlitz

Area
  - Total: 18.97 km^{2} (7.32 sq mi)
- Elevation: 59 m (194 ft)

Population (2009-12-31)
  - Total: 1,581
  - Density: 83.34/km^{2} (215.9/sq mi)
- Time zone: UTC+01:00 (CET)
  - Summer (DST): UTC+02:00 (CEST)
- Postal codes: 06786
- Dialling codes: 034905
- Vehicle registration: WB

Vockerode (German pronunciation: [fɔkəˈʁoːdə]) is a village and a former municipality in the district of Wittenberg, Saxony-Anhalt, Germany. Since 1 January 2011, it is part of the town Oranienbaum-Wörlitz. At Vockerode, there was a large coal-fired power plant, the Vockerode Power Plant. On the area of this power plant was the static inverter of world's first HVDC, the Elbe Project.

The Nelson monument planned by Leopold III, Duke of Anhalt-Dessau was never built. However, the planned location still bears the name Nelson Hügel (Nelson Hill) at the Vockerode war memorial. Due to the German campaign of 1813, the monument was not erected.

== Gallery ==
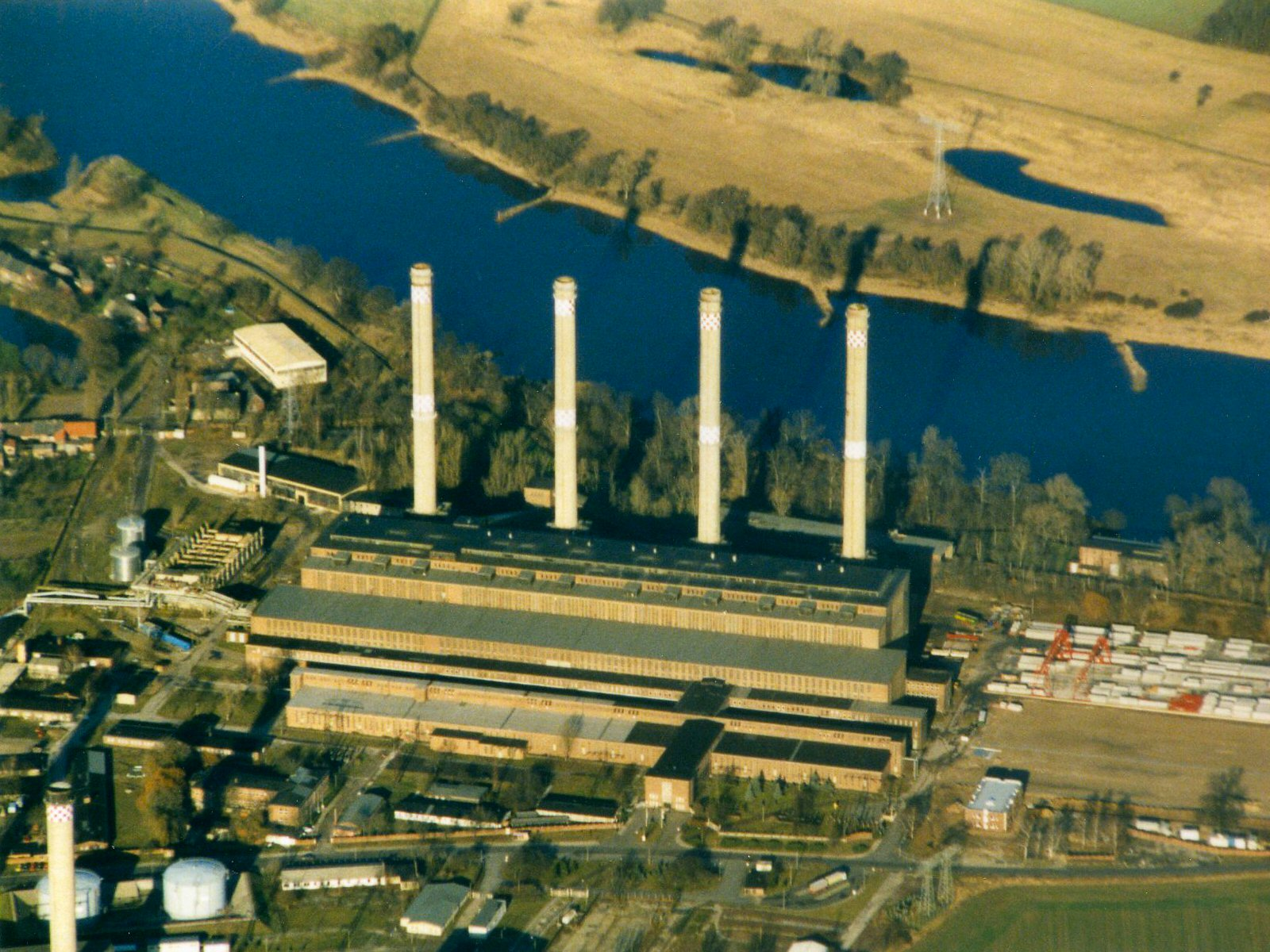
Vockerode power plant (1998)

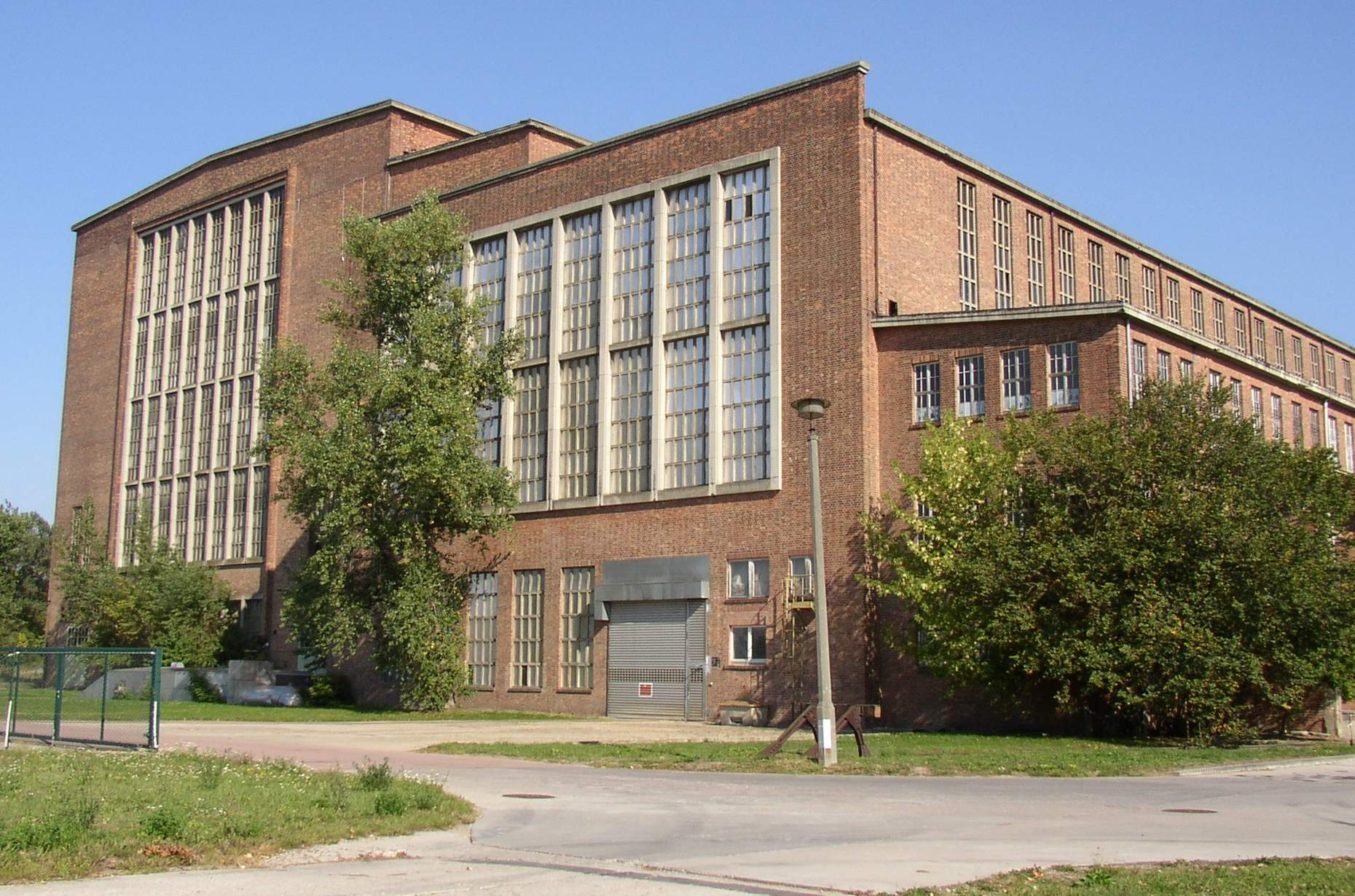
Coal power station in Vockerode (2006)

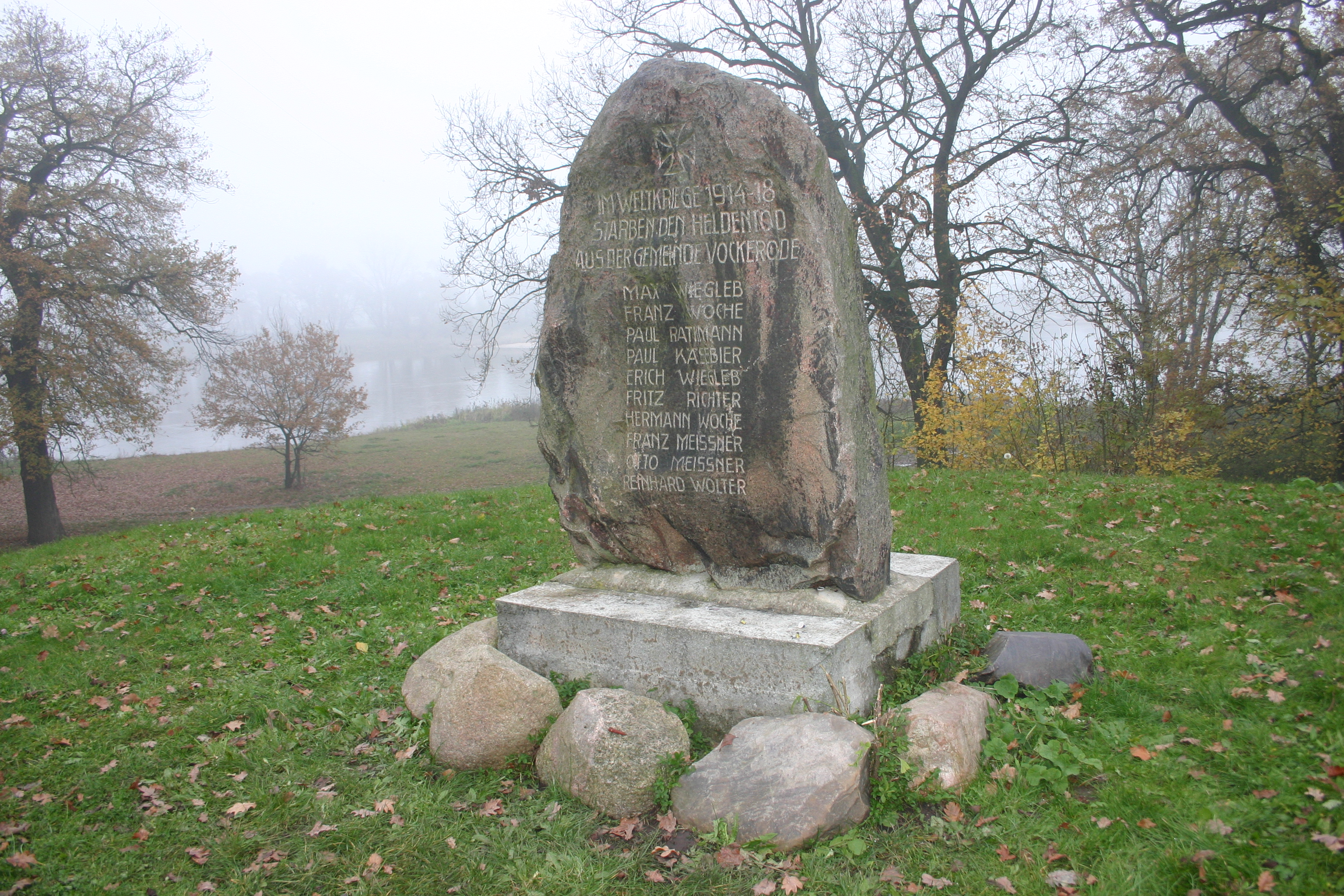
Vockerode war memorial and Nelson Hill (2008)

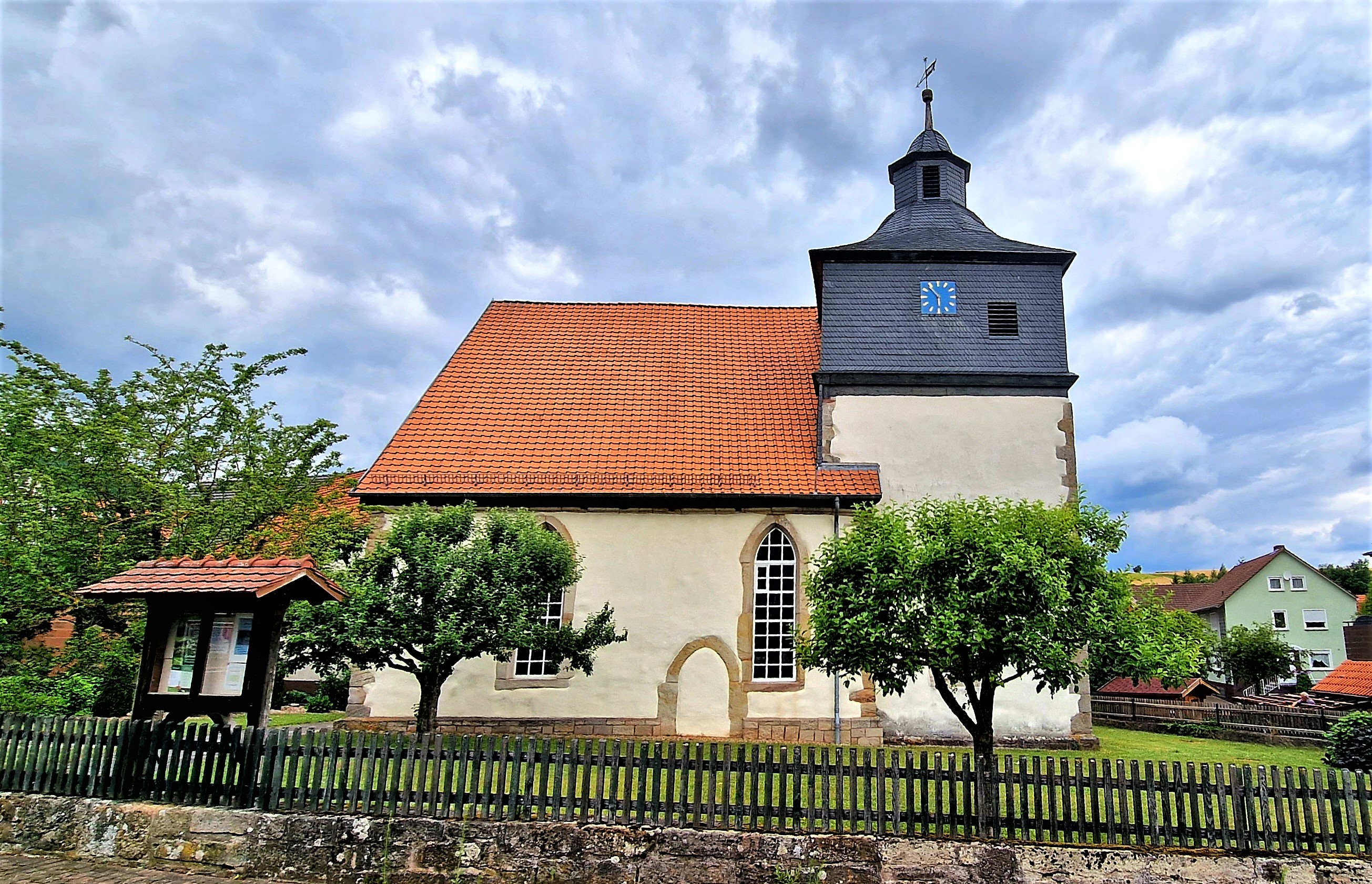
Evangelische Kirche
