= Komsomol direction =

Document of mobilization in the Soviet Union

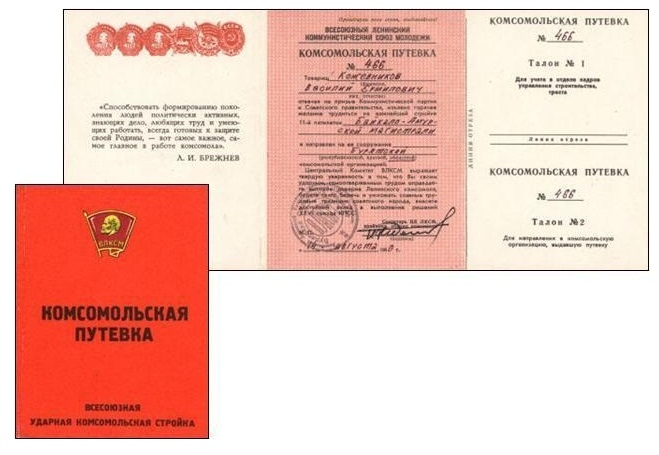
A Komsomol direction for Baikal-Amur Mainline

The Komsomol direction (Russian: комсомольская путёвка, romanized: komsomolskaya putyovka) or Komsomol travel ticket was a mobilization document of in the Soviet Union issued by a Komsomol committee to a Komsomol member, which directed the member to temporary or permanent shock construction projects, study, or military service. Usually the Komsomol direction was associated with relocation to new, poorly settled remote locations: new construction sites ("Komsomol construction sites", комсомольская стройка), army service, etc.

During the 10th five-year plan more than 500,000 young volunteers were assigned to shock construction projects with Komsomol travel tickets. Komsomol organizations formed and directed 100 All-Union squads consisting of 80,000 people.

== Eponymous songs ==
- Комсомольская путёвка, lyrics: Dolmatovsky, music: Pakhmutova
- Комсомольская путёвка (1959), lyrics: Tsezar Solodar, music: Serafim Tulikov

== Gallery ==
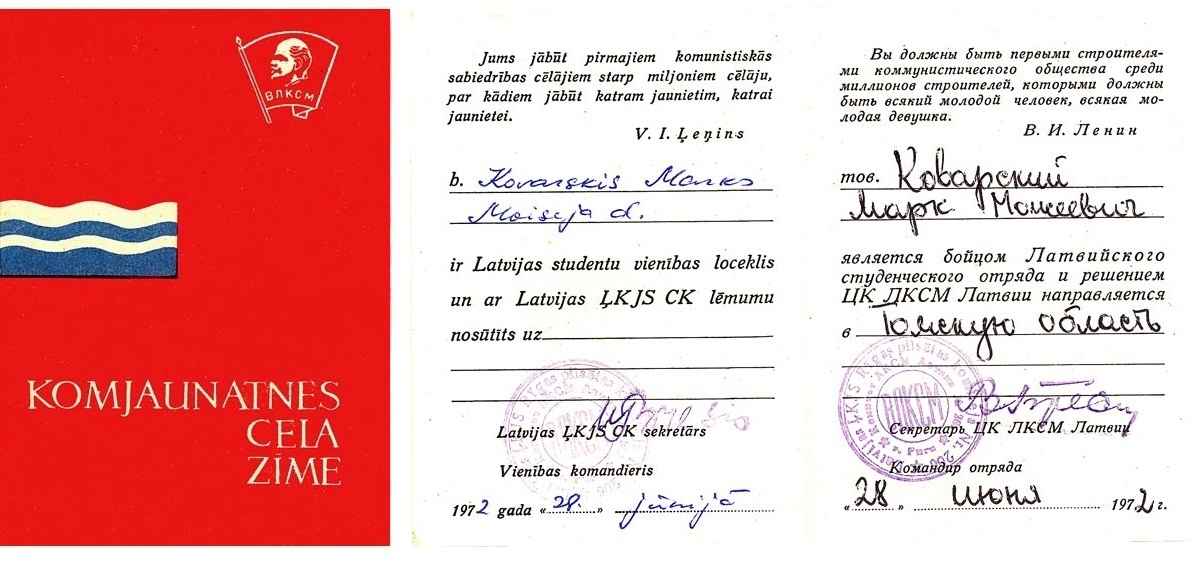
Komsomol travel ticket (Latvian SSR) to a student construction brigade in Tomsk Oblast

== See also ==
- Shock construction projects
- Road to Life (1931 film) – "Putyovka" into Life
