= HVDC Volgograd–Donbass =

Powerline between Volgograd, Russia and Donbas, Ukraine

Volgograd–Donbass
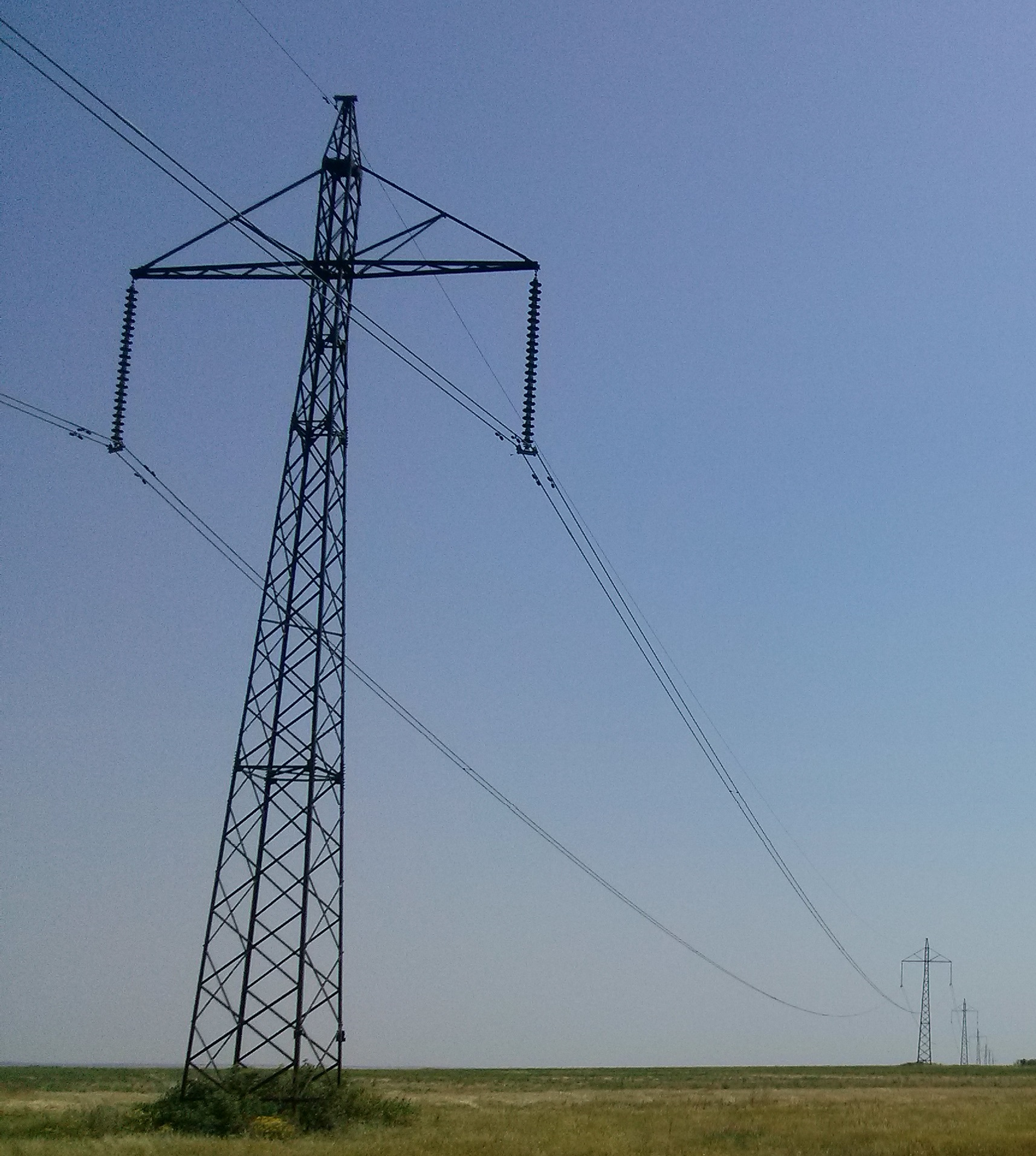
- Pylons of the line in the Volgograd Region
- Location of Volgograd–Donbass

Location
- Country: Russia; Ukraine
- Coordinates: 48°39′13″N 38°33′56″E
- From: Volzhskaya Converter Station (Volga Hydroelectric Station) 48°49′34″N 44°40′20″E
- To: Mykhailivska Converter Station 48°39′13″N 38°33′56″E

Technical information
- Type: overhead line
- Current type: HVDC
- Total length: 475 km (295 mi)
- No. of towers: 1417 (main line), 114 (electrode line Volgograd), 140 (electrode line Ukraine)
- Capacity: 750 MW
- DC voltage: ±400 kV (100 kV)

The HVDC Volgograd–Donbass is a 475 kilometres (295 mi) long bipolar ±400 kV high voltage direct current powerline used for transmitting electric power from Volga Hydroelectric Station at Volgograd in Russia to Donbas in eastern Ukraine and vice versa.

The Volgograd–Donbass system was the second HVDC scheme built in the former Soviet Union, following the Moscow–Kashira HVDC scheme which had already been shut down. The Volgograd–Donbass system can transfer a maximum power of 750 MW. When completed in 1965, its operating voltage of ±400 kV was the highest in the world, and remained so until the completion of the ±450 kV Nelson River scheme in 1977. The scheme is today in a bad state and only operated with a voltage of 100 kV. Nevertheless, it is still being modernized, as a Google Map Picture of its crossing with M-4 motorway at 48°49′41″N 40°24′11″E shows, where one can see that new pylons for the crossing of the motorway are under construction.

There are concerns over potential mercury contamination in the area near the Ukrainian terminal due to the risk of it being destroyed in the Ukrainian-Russian War. Some towers of the line north of Smile at 48°43′21″N 38°52′20″E were destroyed in the war.

== Volzhskaya converter station ==
The terminal at Volga Hydroelectric Station, Volzhskaya converter station, is situated on the dam of the power plant at 48°49′34″N 44°40′20″E. Each of the poles consist of four series connected three-phase valve bridges, which form two series connected twelve pulse bridges. Originally all valves of the scheme were mercury arc valves designed for a voltage of 100 kV and a maximum current of 938 Amperes. Unusually for valves of such high current rating, each valve used only a single anode but because the peak reverse voltage rating was quite limited, two valves were connected in series in each converter arm. The valves used oil-cooled cathode tanks and natural air-cooled anode insulators, with internal grading electrodes inside the porcelain. Each valve stood 3.5 m tall and weighed about 2 tonnes.

In 1977 one mercury arc valve group was replaced by a thyristor valve group. The converter transformers of Volzhskaya converter station are fed directly from the generators of the Volga Hydroelectric Station with 14 kV three-phase AC, whereby two parallel switched generators feed their power into one transformer. The transformers have beside the two secondary windings required for the realization of the 12 pulse valve bridges a third winding for feeding electric power in the local 220 kV grid. The station has no harmonic filters. All required reactive power is delivered from the generators of the power plant.

== Mykhailivska converter station ==
The converter station in Donbas area, the Mykhailivska converter station, is situated northeast of Pervomaisk, Luhansk Oblast at 48°39′13″N 38°33′56″E. Similarly to Volzhskaya converter station, each pole uses four series connected three-phase valve bridges, which form two series connected twelve pulse bridges. As at Volzhskaya converter station one mercury arc valve group was replaced in 1977 by a thyristor valve group. The valves of Mykhailivska converter station are connected through the converter transformers to the local 220 kV grid. Unusually, the DC line crosses the whole AC switchyard of the substation before it enters the valve hall situated at the southern side of the station. The hall is 219 metres (719 ft) long and has a 54 metres (177 ft) long wing pointing in south-southwesterly direction. The Mikhailovskaya converter station has three harmonic filters, each with a reactive power of 132 MVA, which are situated 100 metres (330 ft) northerly of the AC switchyard.

== Powerline ==
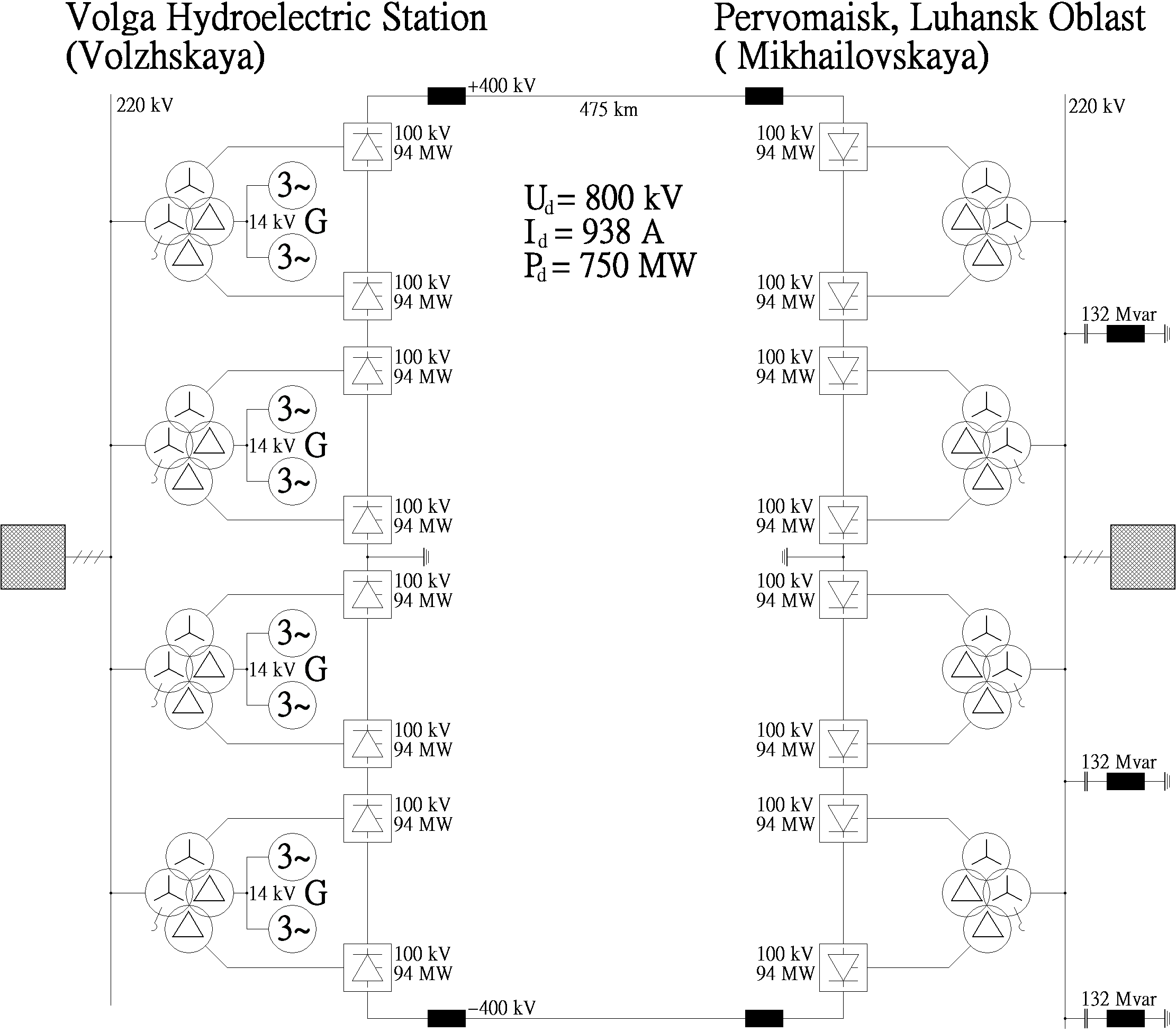
Single Line Diagram of HVDC Volgograd–Donbass

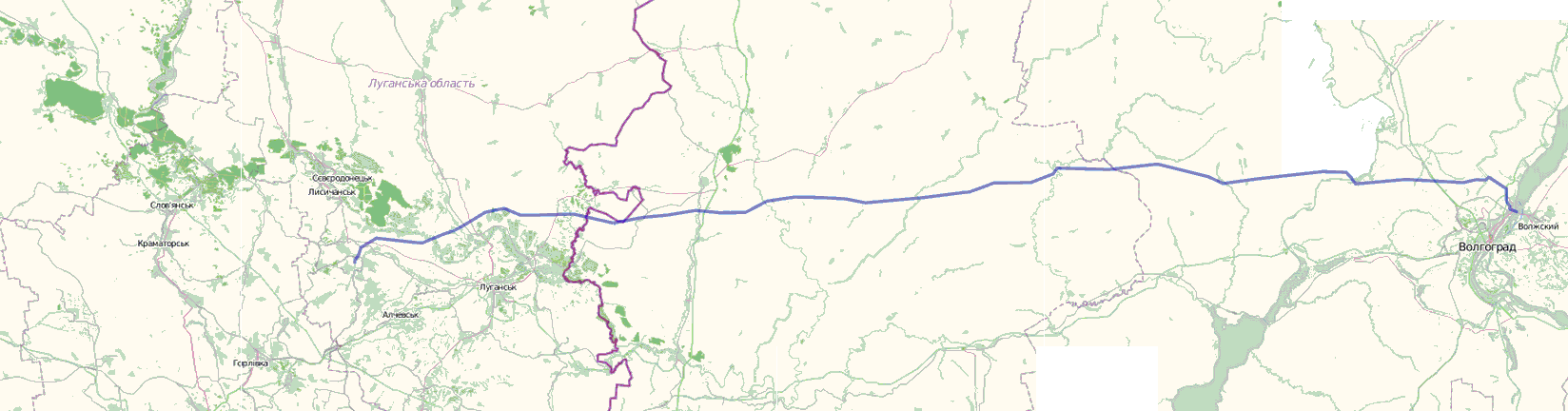
Track of HVDC Volgograd-Donbass

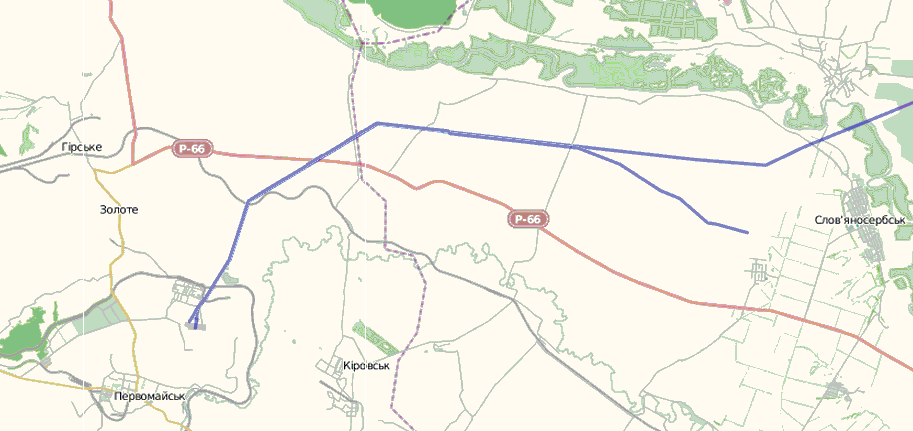
Track of HVDC Volgograd-Donbass near Mykhailivska Static Inverter Plant. The electrode line starts at Mykhailivska Static Inverter Plant west of the main line, runs parallel to it, undercrosses it at 48°44′1″N 38°43′26″E and ends west of Slovyanoserbsk.

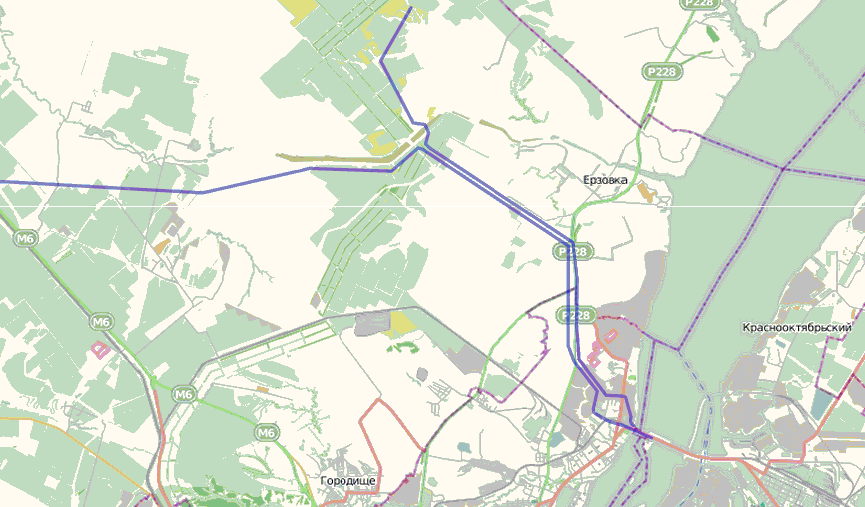
Track of HVDC Volgograd-Donbass near Volgograd. The electrode line runs east of the main line and ends just below the top of the map.

The powerline to Donbas area has a length of 475 kilometres (295 mi) and the entire length is overhead line.

The suspension towers have a single crossbar, carrying one conductor on a suspension insulator at each end of it. Two types of strainers are used: lattice towers similar to the suspension towers, but equipped with strainer insulators and of stronger design and much more often pole-type towers with a central pole supported by two diagonal bars. The latter towers carry only one conductor, and there are always 2 such towers close together.

South of Solinky at 48°43′25″N 38°51′25″E, there is an unusual double pylon in the line, at which one conductor is fixed at suspension insulators, while the other is fixed with strainer insulators. The exact use of this pylon is unknown. It may carry equipment for extracting PLC-signals from the line, which may be used by Solinky 110 kV substation approximately 1 kilometres northward.

Southwest of Kamennyy between 48°56′13″N 44°30′11″E and 48°56′48″N 44°31′11″E the line is installed on portal pylons designed for 3 conductors, although the line has there as in all other sections just 2 conductors.

The conductors consist of bundles of 2 ACSR-conductors with 600 mm2 cross section. The whole line is equipped with a single ground wire. It is a single ACSR-wire with 70 mm2 cross section and fixed on the pinnacles of the pylons.

The line leaves Mykhailivska converter station in north-northeast direction. Southeast of Onkhove it turns east-northeasterly. South of Prychiplivka it turns eastwards. East of Chervonyi Lyman it changes its way to east-northeast and passes Shchastia northward. North of Petrivka the line runs eastwards and then after Nyznoteple southwards in order not to cross a populated valley. Then at Teple it turns eastwards, however changes its way to east-southeast direction north of Harasmythka. The border to Russia is crossed north of Ushakovka at 48°48′37″N 39°46′47″E, but it enters Ukraine again for a very short section south of Talove at 48°47′37″N 39°58′29″E. The line runs in Russia past Krasnovka and Novotalovka until Taradinka eastwards, where it turns again toward northeast. North of Krivorzne its direction went more eastwards. In its further track, it passes between Krinychnyy and Melnichnny and runs past Krasnoschekov and Krasnoyarovka through large fields to Varlamovka. In its further track it passes south of Rusakov, south of Kalmykovsky and south of Erik. Behind Erik, its way nears Don River. Short before Don River the line turns to southeasterly in order to cross it in a right angle, The crossing itself, which is situated near Peskovatka at 48°56′25″N 43°48′9″E has a span width of 608 metres (1,995 ft). As the west bank of Don River is here a hill, there are no extraordinary tall pylons used. After Don Crossing it runs the remaining way to Volgograd until a point 5 kilometres east of Kuzmichi, where it meets the 500 kV AC lines to Volgograd Hydroelectric Plant nearly straight eastward. Then it turns southeasterly and south of Erzovka southward. It crosses several areas with recreational garden houses in the northern quarters of Volgograd and passes southerly an industrial complex and the 500 kV switchyard of Volga Hydroelectric Power Plant before it reaches its destination, the inverter plant of Volga Hydroelectric Plant, which is integrated in the power station. One conductor of the line ends at the Western end of the Power Station Building, while the other crosses on the pylons of the 220 kV-powerline, which starts here the building and ends on the other site of the building. This comes from the fact, that the valve groups are switched in series and each valve group is fed by its own machine.

== Electrodes and electrode lines ==
HVDC Volgograd–Donbass can be operated as a monopolar scheme with ground return, therefore two ground electrodes are installed. Both electrodes are designed as land electrodes consisting of a single steel rod with 30 millimetres diameter whereby coke backfill is used.

The electrode lines, which look like a 110 kV-powerlines with 2 conductors, use similar, but smaller pylons as the main line. In opposite to the main line, all strainers are free-standing lattice towers with a single crossbar, while the suspension towers of the electrode line are usually concrete poles with a single crossbar made of steel. Only suspension towers of extraordinary height are built as lattice towers.

The electrode of Mykhailivska converter station is situated north of Smile at 48°41′31.94″N 38°54′35.93″E. It is connected with Mikhailovskaya converter station by a 32 kilometre long overhead line, which consists of two parallelized 2450 mm2 ACSR conductors. The electrode line from Mikhailovskaya converter station follows the main line on the left side seen from Mykhailivska converter station until a point northeast of Zolobok at 48°44′0.98″N 38°43′26.31″E where it undercrosses the main line. After this point, it follows the main line on the other site until a point south of Krymske at 48°43′37.55″N 38°48′16.55″E where it leaves the course of the main line in southeast direction toward the electrode.

The electrode for the terminal at Volgograd is situated northwest of Kamennyy at 49°00′13.11″N 44°30′56.1″E. It is connected with it by a 24 kilometre long overhead line consisting of two parallelized 2450 mm2 ACSR conductors.

Tower at this location, 48.830929°N 44.653909°E, completely removed between Oct 2021 and Jun 2022 on Google Earth images. Additional towers also removed until & over rail crossing.

48.827546°N 44.665425°E last remaining tower at hydroelectric dam.

== Trivia ==
- HVDC Volgograd–Donbass was the first long-distance HVDC link without a submarine cable section
- HVDC Volgograd–Donbass is the only HVDC scheme in Europe implemented as overhead line in its whole length
- HVDC Volgograd–Donbass is the only long distance HVDC system operational in Russia. The experimental Moscow–Kashira scheme has been shut down and the planned ±750 kV, 2400 km Ekibastuz–Tambov scheme, which would have had the longest transmission distance and highest voltage in the world at the time, was never completed because of the collapse of the Soviet Union in the early 1990s.

== Waypoints ==
Right of way of HVDC Volgograd–Donbass, according to Google-Maps. May be imperfect due to low resolution.

=== Russia ===
Number	Coordinates
1	48.8275979°N 44.6677548°E
2	48.8275714°N 44.6654695°E
3	48.8309245°N 44.6539253°E
4	48.8325347°N 44.648459°E
5	48.8380961°N 44.6294099°E
6	48.8396319°N 44.6291149°E
7	48.8467599°N 44.6316737°E
8	48.8592093°N 44.6170878°E
9	48.8654629°N 44.6133757°E
10	48.9065045°N 44.6133757°E
11	48.9374952°N 44.4852358°E
12	48.9460538°N 44.5227921°E
13	48.9466739°N 44.5198739°E
14	48.9371816°N 44.5031583°E
15	48.938207°N 44.4519228°E
16	48.9283819°N 44.3857741°E
17	48.939398°N 44.0861768°E
18	48.9264469°N 43.8697815°E
19	48.923574°N 43.8214481°E
20	48.9375833°N 43.803429°E
21	48.9428053°N 43.80153°E
22	48.9636948°N 43.7710118°E
23	48.9648922°N 43.7083769°E
24	48.966146°N 43.6493897°E
25	48.9575381°N 43.5286474°E
26	48.9247833°N 43.1220245°E
27	48.9315221°N 43.0998373°E
28	48.9473221°N 43.0476522°E
29	48.951141°N 43.0236197°E
30	48.9908204°N 42.7800965°E
31	48.9762384°N 42.580803°E
32	48.9721749°N 42.5271964°E
33	48.9768228°N 42.2533107°E
34	48.9568758°N 42.2324538°E
35	48.9444331°N 42.1830368°E
36	48.9272787°N 42.116003°E
37	48.9253332°N 41.918807°E
38	48.8942079°N 41.7907691°E
39	48.8929805°N 41.7585611°E
40	48.8575717°N 41.2533402°E
41	48.857132°N 41.248351°E
42	48.8687376°N 41.1589479°E
43	48.870498°N 41.144671°E
44	48.8770574°N 40.8744407°E
45	48.8631797°N 40.7305589°E
46	48.8237696°N 40.6174636°E
47	48.8230844°N 40.4806709°E
48	48.823155°N 40.4802847°E
49	48.8297662°N 40.3772235°E
50	48.8295685°N 40.3752708°E
51	48.8304654°N 40.3531587°E
52	48.8144659°N 40.2035666°E
53	48.8075277°N 40.0879365°E
54	48.8076831°N 40.0850075°E
55	48.7945176°N 39.9812114°E
56	48.7878664°N 39.9296701°E

=== Ukraine ===
Number	Coordinates
55	48.8201034°N 39.7147822°E
56	48.8167831°N 39.4337511°E
57	48.84008°N 39.35042°E
58	48.8261217°N 39.2508137°E
59	48.7198055°N 38.9216423°E
60	48.7369143°N 38.6794281°E
61	48.7049708°N 38.5990101°E
62	48.6648482°N 38.5721719°E
63	48.6608515°N 38.5668719°E
64	48.6520953°N 38.5651928°E

=== Electrode Line in Ukraine ===
Number	Coordinates
1	48.6555399°N 38.5614431°E
2	48.6612555°N 38.5665286°E
3	48.6698613°N 38.5760772°E
4	48.6810017°N 38.5866344°E
5	48.7053177°N 38.598758°E
6	48.7373601°N 38.6787736°E
7	48.7341476°N 38.7235826°E
8	48.7330861°N 38.7243551°E
9	48.7270991°N 38.8045961°E
10	48.7204213°N 38.8302702°E
11	48.7095835°N 38.8557565°E
12	48.7062771°N 38.8678533°E
12A	48.6962471°N 38.8852555°E
14	48.6958257°N 38.8902229°E
15	48.6922069°N 38.9099801°E

=== Electrode Line in Russia ===
Incomplete as line cannot be tracked on Wikimapia through Volgograd

Number	Coordinates
1	49.0036352°N 44.5155823°E
2	48.9835722°N 44.4980675°E
3	48.9819175°N 44.4965869°E
4	48.9564672°N 44.5169556°E
5	48.9557768°N 44.5242727°E
6	48.9525008°N 44.5265579°E
7	48.9478154°N 44.5246482°E
8	48.9460855°N 44.5273948°E
9	48.9073824°N 44.6167982°E
10	48.892589°N 44.6194214°E
11	48.8732152°N 44.6189811°E
12	48.8592376°N 44.6205157°E
13	48.8446841°N 44.6374083°E
14	48.8443835°N 44.647201°E
15	48.8439232°N 44.6495557°E
16	48.8359546°N 44.6529463°E
17	48.8349981°N 44.6527851°E
18	48.8342089°N 44.6524766°E
19	48.833139°N 44.6531472°E
20	48.8322385°N 44.6544936°E
