= Volga Hydroelectric Station =

Volga Hydroelectric Power Station
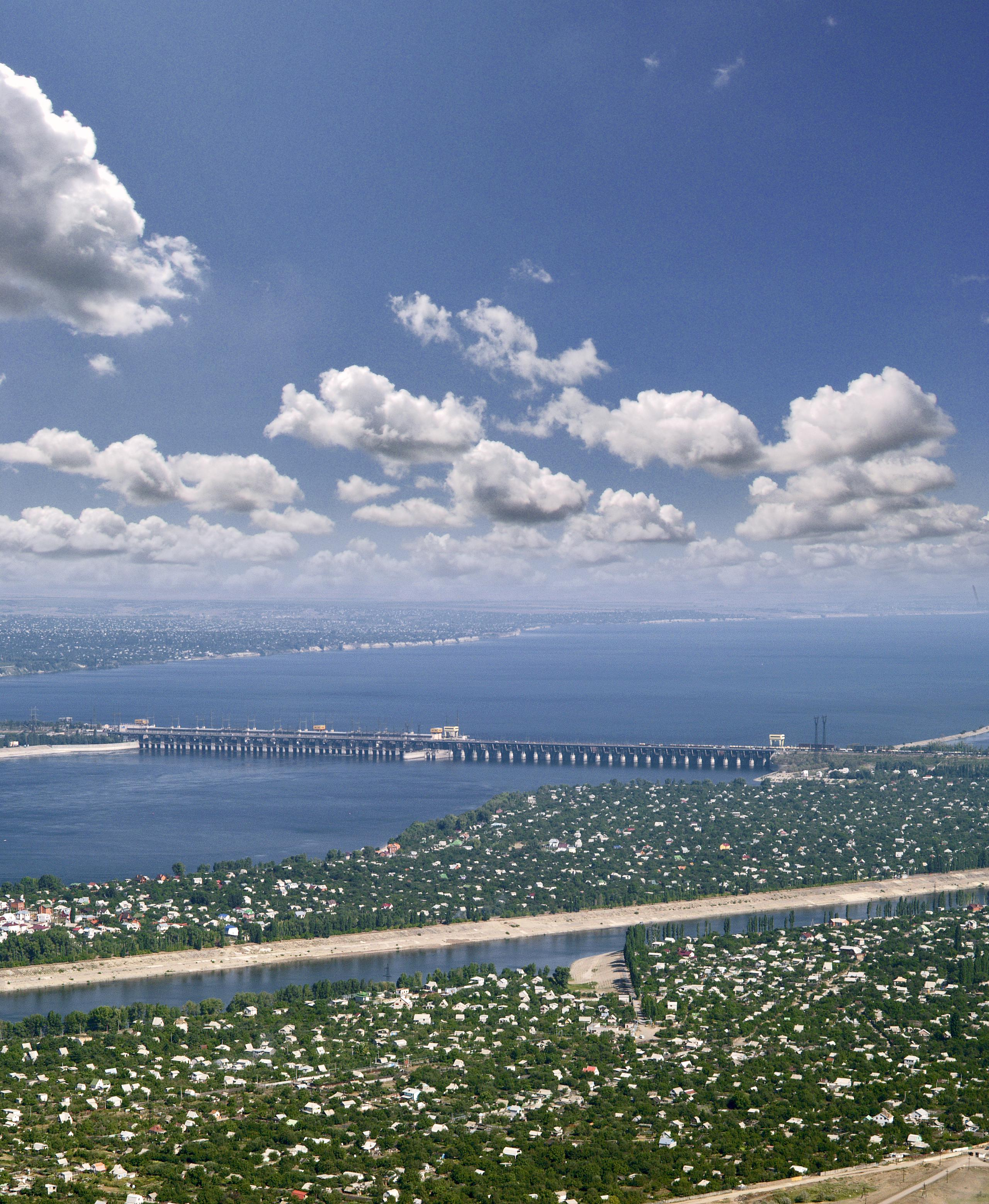
- Interactive map of Volga Hydroelectric Power Station
- Official name: Волжская ГЭС
- Location: Volga, Russia
- Coordinates: 48°49′34″N 44°40′19″E
- Construction began: 6 August 1950
- Opening date: 10 September 1961
- Operator: RusHydro

Dam and spillways
- Impounds: Volga River
- Height: 44 m (144 ft)
- Length: 725 m (2,379 ft)

Reservoir
- Creates: Volgograd Reservoir
- Total capacity: 31.5 km^{3} (8 mi^{3})
- Surface area: 3,117 km^{2} (1,203 mi^{2})

Power Station
- Turbines: 1 × 115.0 MW; 16 × 125.5 MW; 5 × 120.0 MW; 1 × 11.0 MW
- Installed capacity: 2,734 MW; 2,744.5 MW (max)
- Annual generation: 10,999 GWh (2015)
- Static inverter of HVDC Volgograd-Donbass on dam

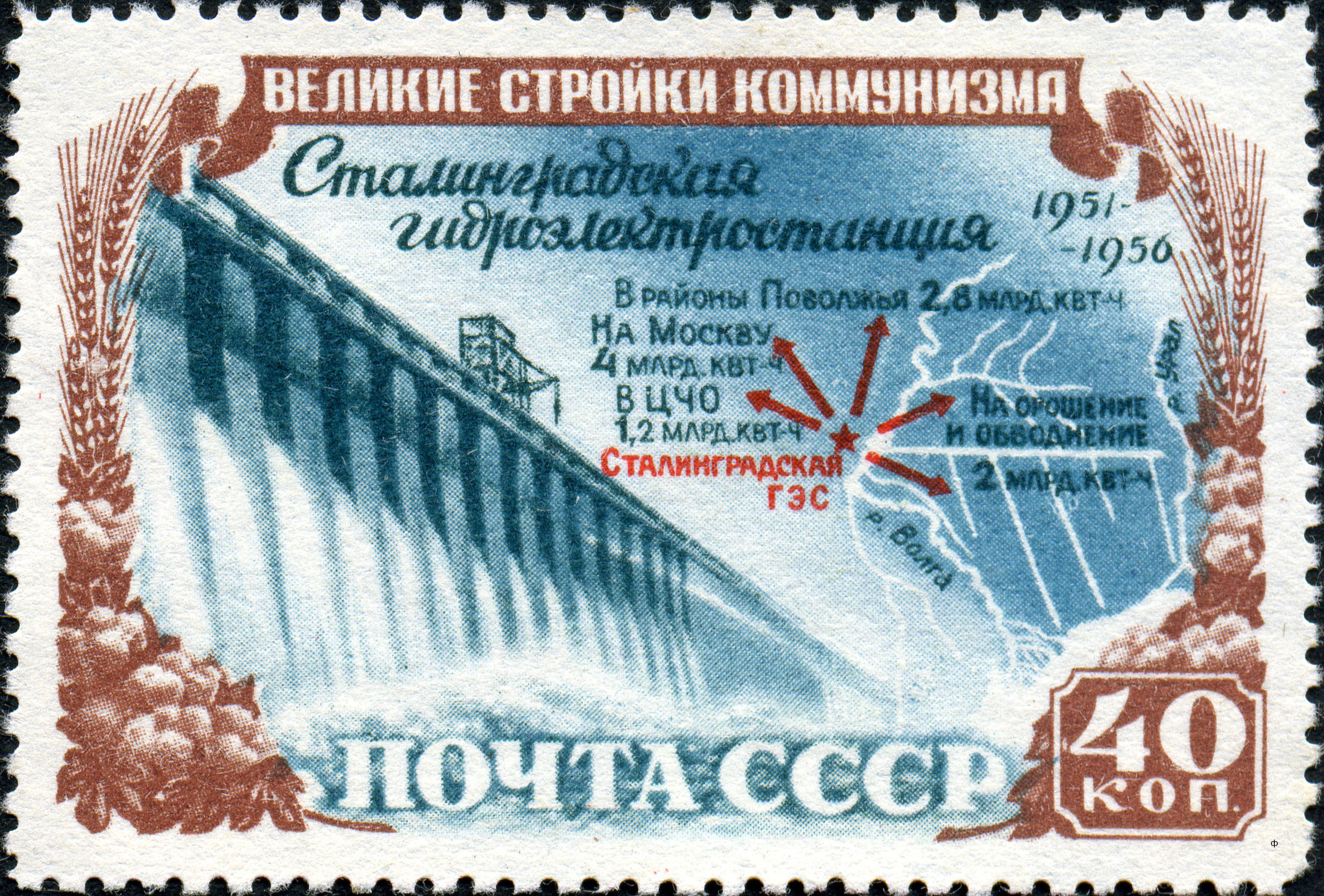
In the Soviet Union, large hydroelectric power plants were among the Great Construction Projects of Communism. Stalingrad/Volgograd Hydroelectric Station was one of them.

The Volga Hydroelectric Station or Volga GES (Russian: Волжская ГЭС) also known as the 22nd Congress of the CPSU Stalingrad/Volgograd Hydroelectric Power Station (Russian: Сталинградская/Волгоградская ГЭС имени XXII съезда КПСС), is the largest hydroelectric station in Europe, and the last of the Volga-Kama Cascade of dams, immediately before the Volga River flows into the Caspian Sea. It was the largest powerstation in the world between 1960 and 1963. Today, it is operated by the partly government-owned electricity company RusHydro.

== History ==
Built as part of a massive postwar effort known as the Great Construction Projects of Communism, it was authorized by Joseph Stalin signing the Council of Ministers of the USSR order #3555 on 6 August 1950. The plan called for building a station north of the city of Stalingrad (modern Volgograd) with a minimum storage capacity of 1.7 million kWh.

Ten thousand youths from the Komsomol league participated in the construction, and the city of Volzhsky was formed on the left bank of the river to provide housing. Machinery was sent from all corners of the country; Moscow, Tashkent, Chelyabinsk and Kharkov, and forestry from Karelia. New electrical equipment came from Zaporozhye and Sverdlovsk. The turbines and generators were built in Leningrad. In total more than 1,500 individual plants and dozens of research institutes sent equipment and specialists.

The first powerhouse came online on 22 December 1958, and the plant was declared complete on 10 September 1961. Technologically the station broke much new ground. In 1959 a new Moscow-Stalingrad 500 kV high voltage line power came into operation. Several years later, for the first time in the world, an experimental 800 kV DC line, Donbas to Volgograd, was successfully tested and later became operational. During the 1960s and 1970s several new types of electrotechnical and hydromechanical machines were tested for future Siberian and foreign stations.

== Technical details ==
Today the station is the largest in Europe. It consists of a 725-metre long, 44-metre high concrete dam that crosses the Volga river. Supporting it is a 3250-metre-long landfilled dam with a maximum height of 47 metres. The station also offers railway and road crossings of the Volga.

The present power rating of the station is 2,734 MW and annual energy output of ~12 billion kilowatt hours. There are a total of 22 generators. One generator produces 115 MW, 16 produce 125.5 MW each, and five produce 120 MW each. There is an additional 11 MW unit.

The 4.9 kilometer dam forms the Volgograd reservoir. At present the station is managed by OAO Volzhskaya GES that is owned by OAO GidroOGK, a daughter company of the state organisation RAO AES Rossii.

The generators of the power plant are connected to the power grid in a somewhat unusual way, since the machine transformers of the generators serve also as the inverter transformers of the static inverter plant of HVDC Volgograd-Donbass, which is on the dam. In contrast to other static inverter plants, it has no harmonic filters.

== Economic value ==
The new plant played a decisive role in the development of the Lower Volga region and the Donbass, as well as uniting the large energetic system of the Central, Volga, and Southern economic regions. The new dam also allowed for the Volga to become navigable, allowing for a path from Saratov to Astrakhan and the Caspian. In addition, there were projects for the irrigation of the excessive adjacent dry region of the left bank Volga south of it, particularly the West Kazakhstan Province.

The power generated by the station is used primarily by the city of Volgograd, by Moscow, by Donbas via the only long distance HVDC-line in Russia, the HVDC Volgograd-Donbass.

== Ecology ==
One of the most negative results that the dam caused was that it destroyed the traditional path of Caspian fish migration to their breeding grounds. The most affected became the beluga sturgeon, crucial to the Black Caviar industry. The fishery canal turned out to be inefficient, and from 1962 to 1967 the annual production rate was 15 percent of that before the dam. The other major effect of the dam is that it formed one of the largest reservoirs, which amounts for a behemoth volume 31.5 cubic kilometres of water and stretches 540 km long, and up to 17 km wide with a massive 3,117 square kilometre surface area. As a result, numerous settlements and fertile lands were lost.

== See also ==
- List of conventional hydroelectric power stations
- List of power stations in Russia
- HVDC Volgograd-Donbass
