= Great Construction Projects of Communism =

Major projects in the Soviet Union

Great Construction Projects of Communism (Russian: Великие стройки коммунизма) is a phrase that is used to identify a series of the most ambitious construction megaprojects of major great importance for the economy of the Soviet Union. The projects were initiated in the 1950s on the command of Joseph Stalin.

The following projects in irrigation, navigation, and hydroelectric power were initiated in 1950.

- Kuybyshev Hydroelectric Station, now Zhiguli Hydroelectric Station in Samara Oblast, Russia
- Stalingrad Hydroelectric Station, now Volga Hydroelectric Station near Volgograd, and the associated irrigation network in the Caspian Depression
- The system of Kakhovka Hydroelectric Power Plant in the lower part of the Dnieper river
- North Crimean Canal, Kakhovka Canal, and irrigation networks in northern Crimea and southern Ukraine
- Main Turkmen Canal, unfinished
- The Volga–Don Canal
Soviet postal stamp series, 1951

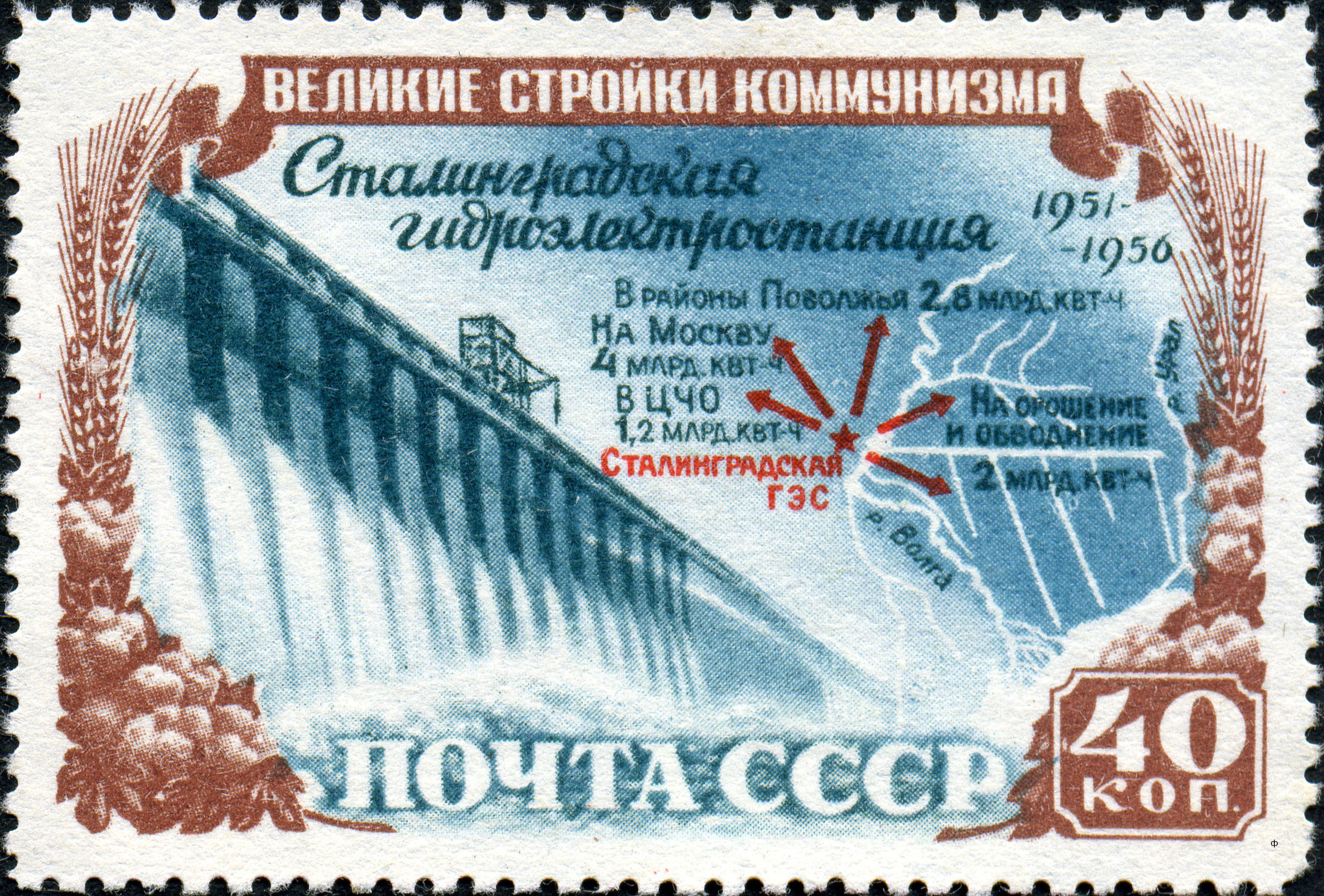
Stalingrad Hydroelectric Station

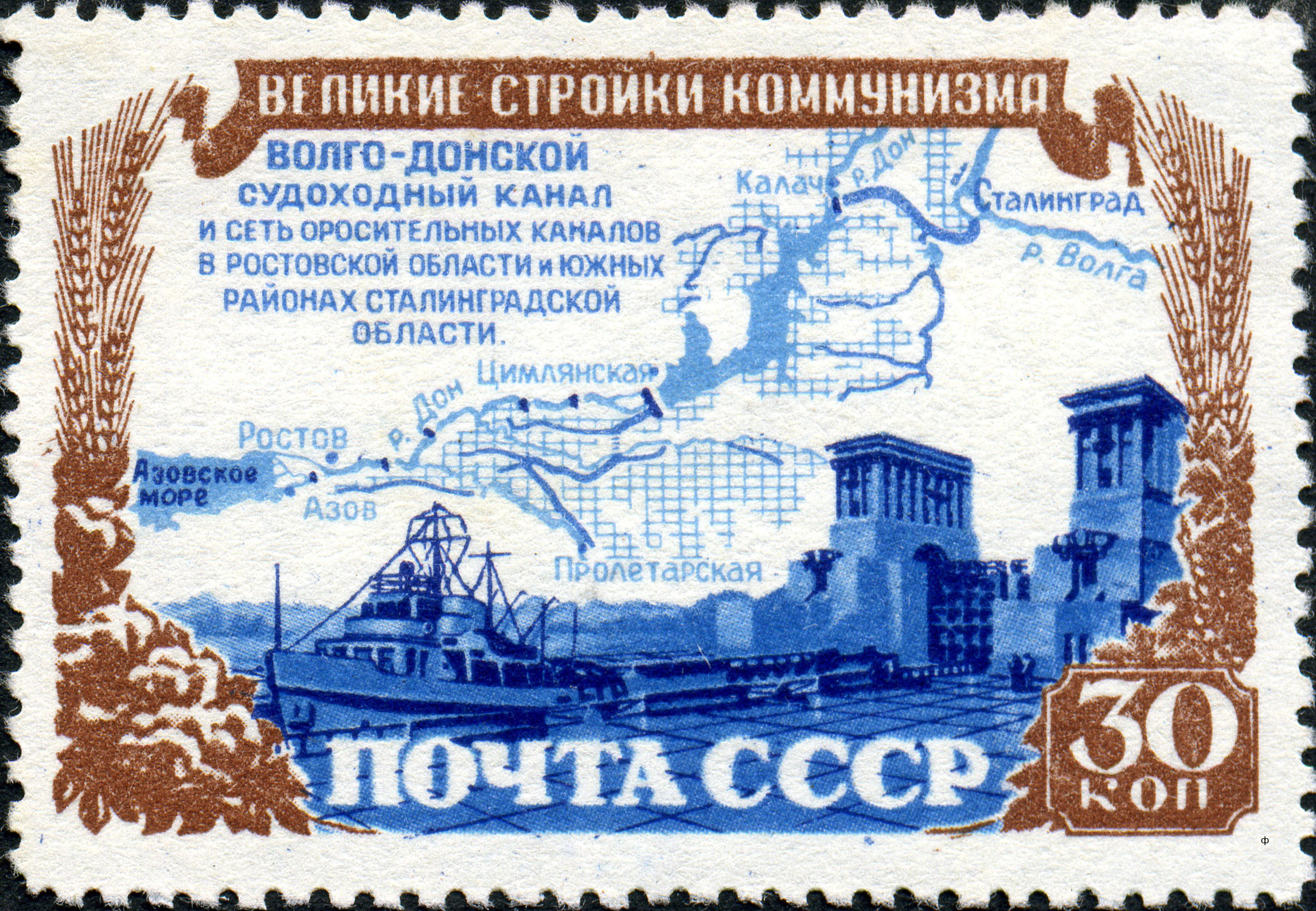
Volga–Don Canal

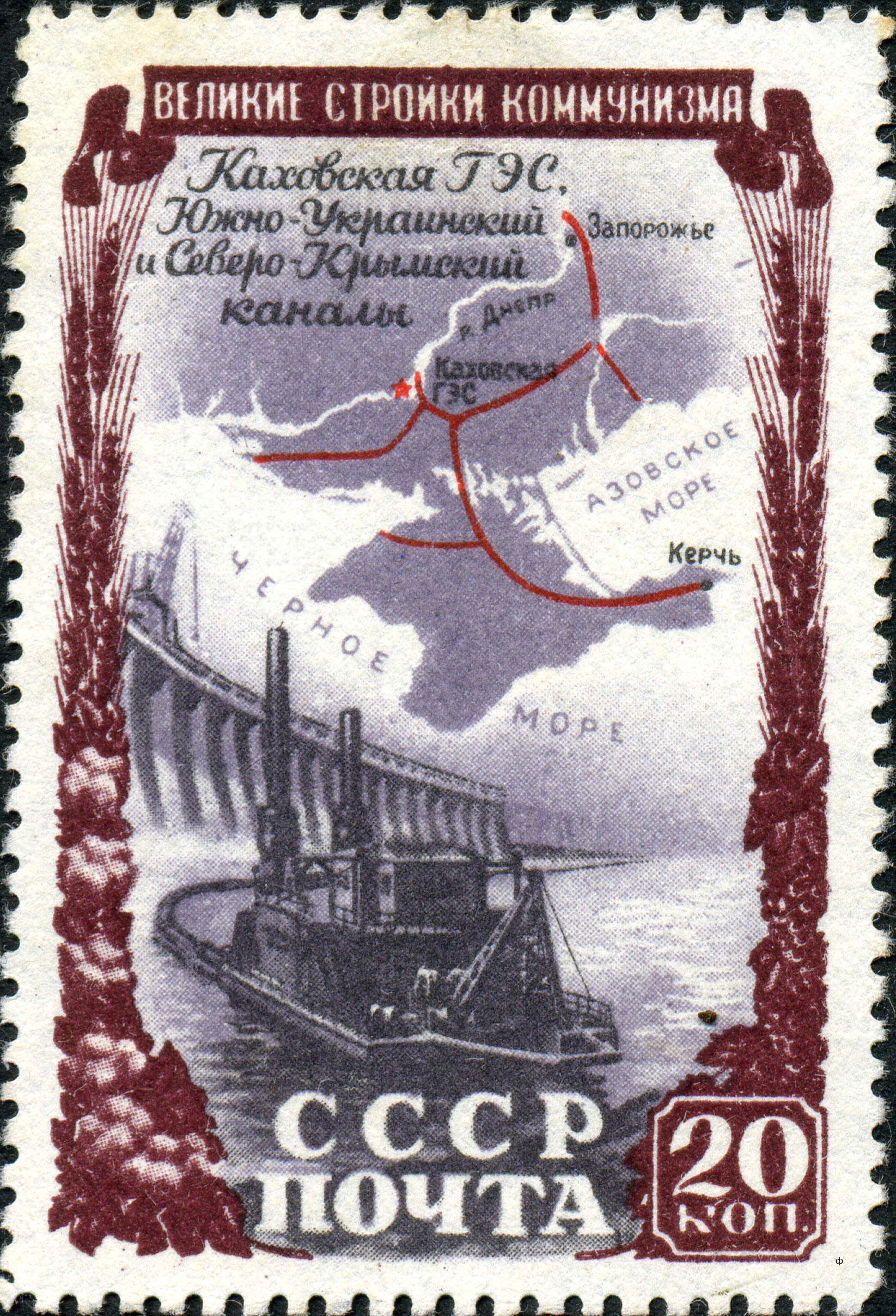
Kakhovka Dam

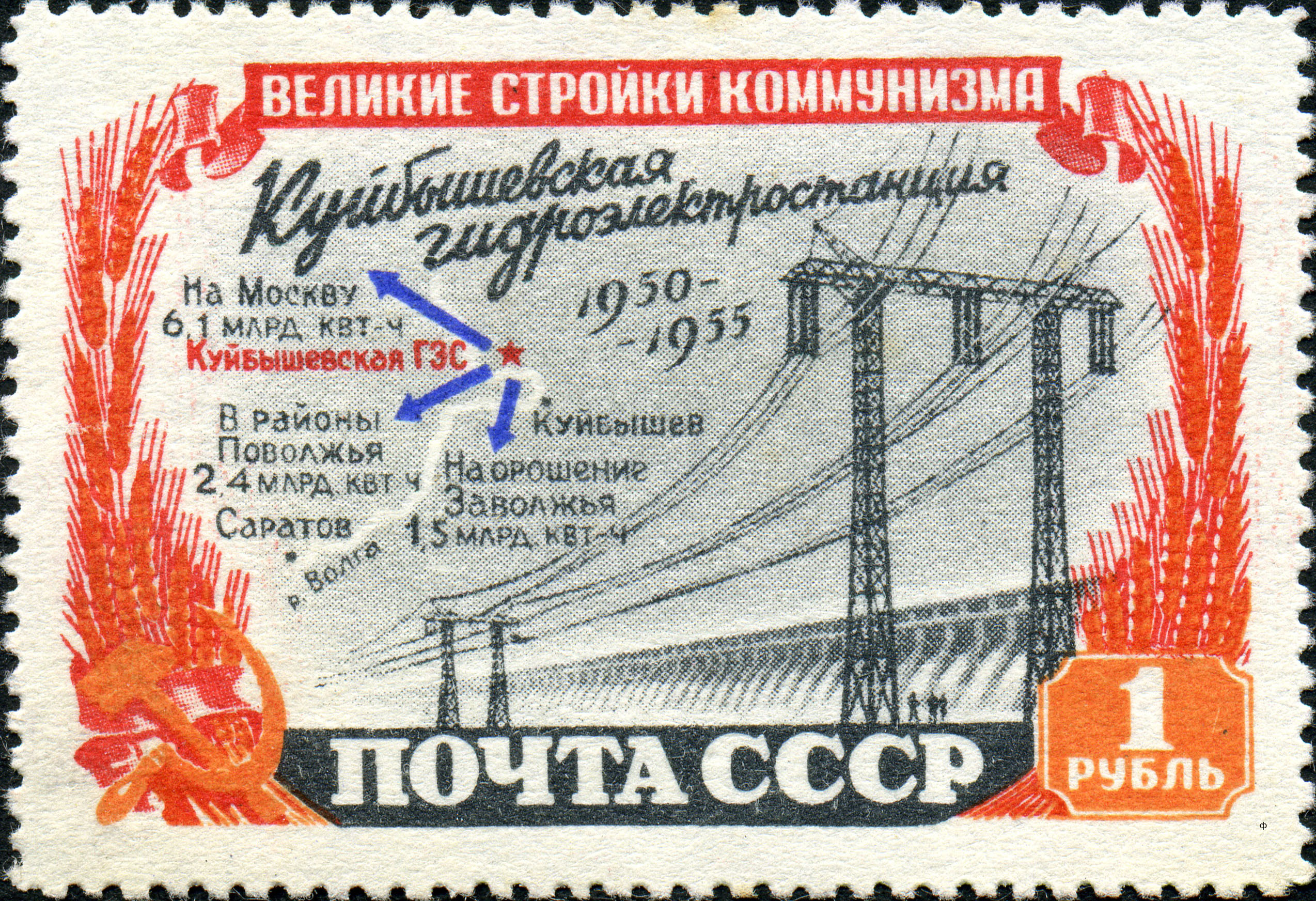
Kuybyshev Hydroelectric Station

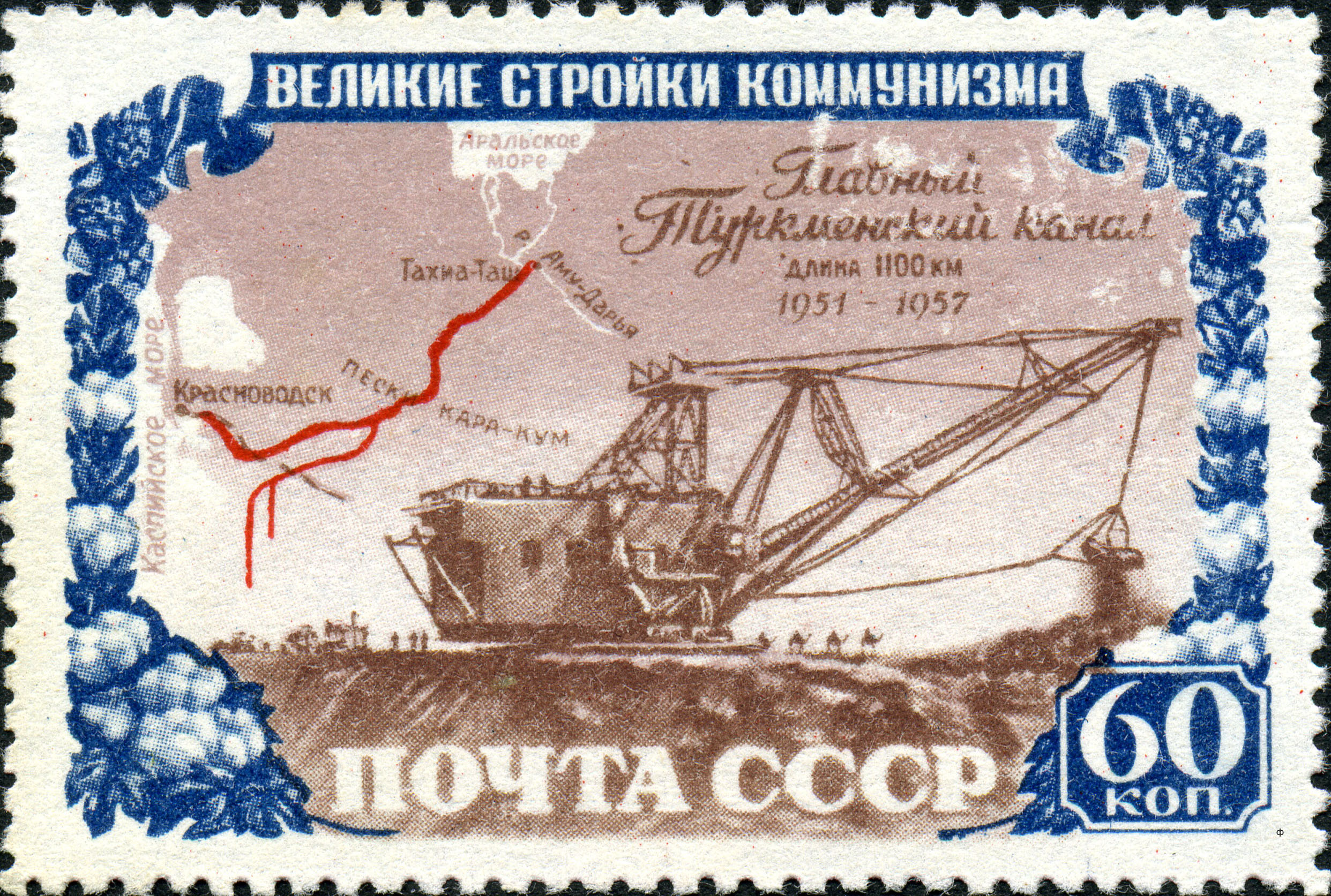
Main Turkmen Canal

Other "construction projects of Communism" include:

- Tsimlyansk Hydroelectric Station, now in Rostov Oblast, Russia
- The White Sea–Baltic Canal
- The Moscow Canal
- Dnieper Hydroelectric Station
- Bratsk Hydroelectric Power Station
- "Magnitka": Magnitogorsk Iron and Steel Works
- Baikal–Amur Mainline

== See also ==
- Northern river reversal, another ambitious Soviet project
- Great Plan for the Transformation of Nature
- Shock construction projects
- Ten Great Buildings in 1950s Beijing
- GOELRO
