= Vockerode Power Plant =

Coordinates: 51°50′44″N 12°21′31″E

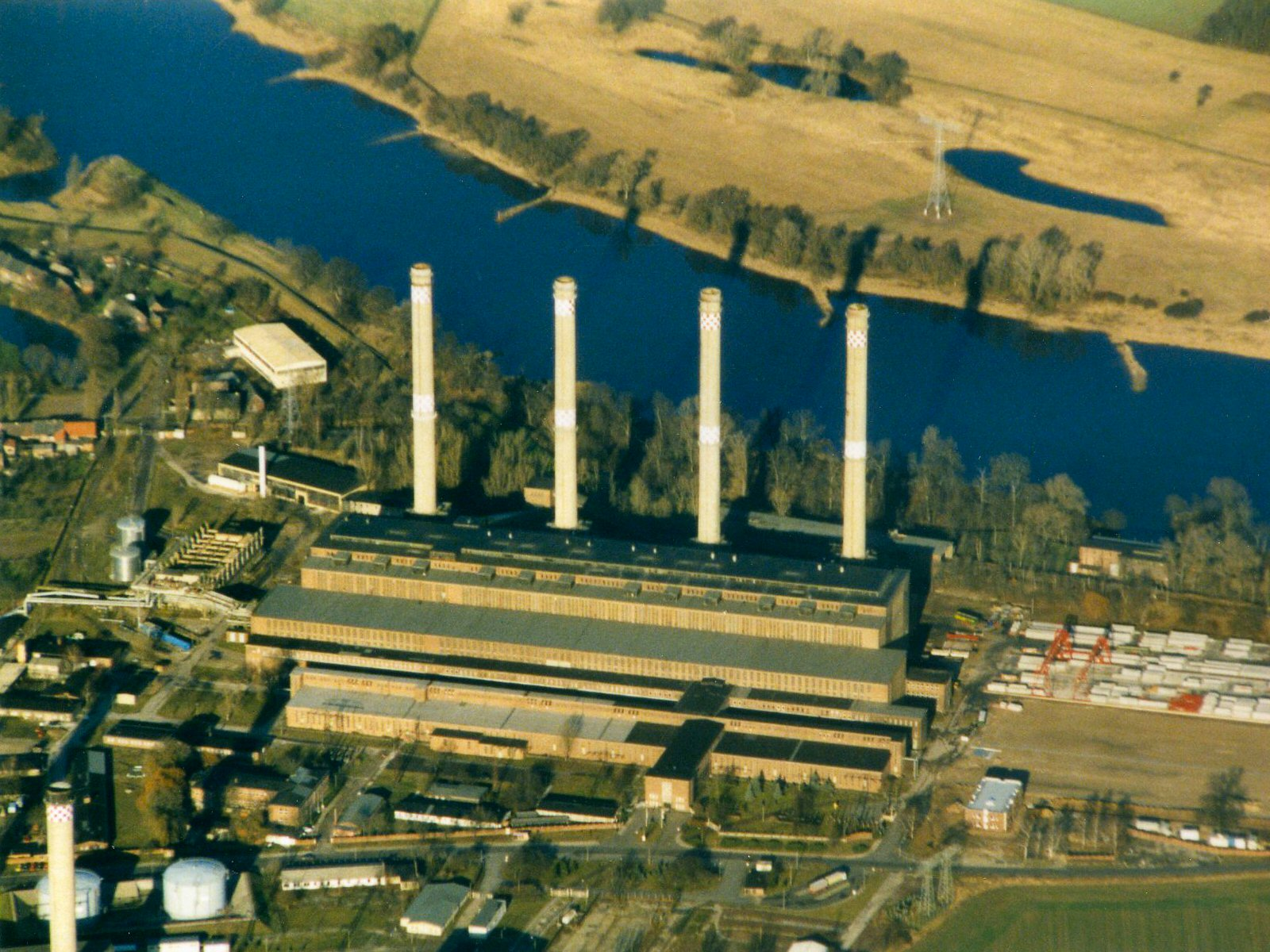
1998

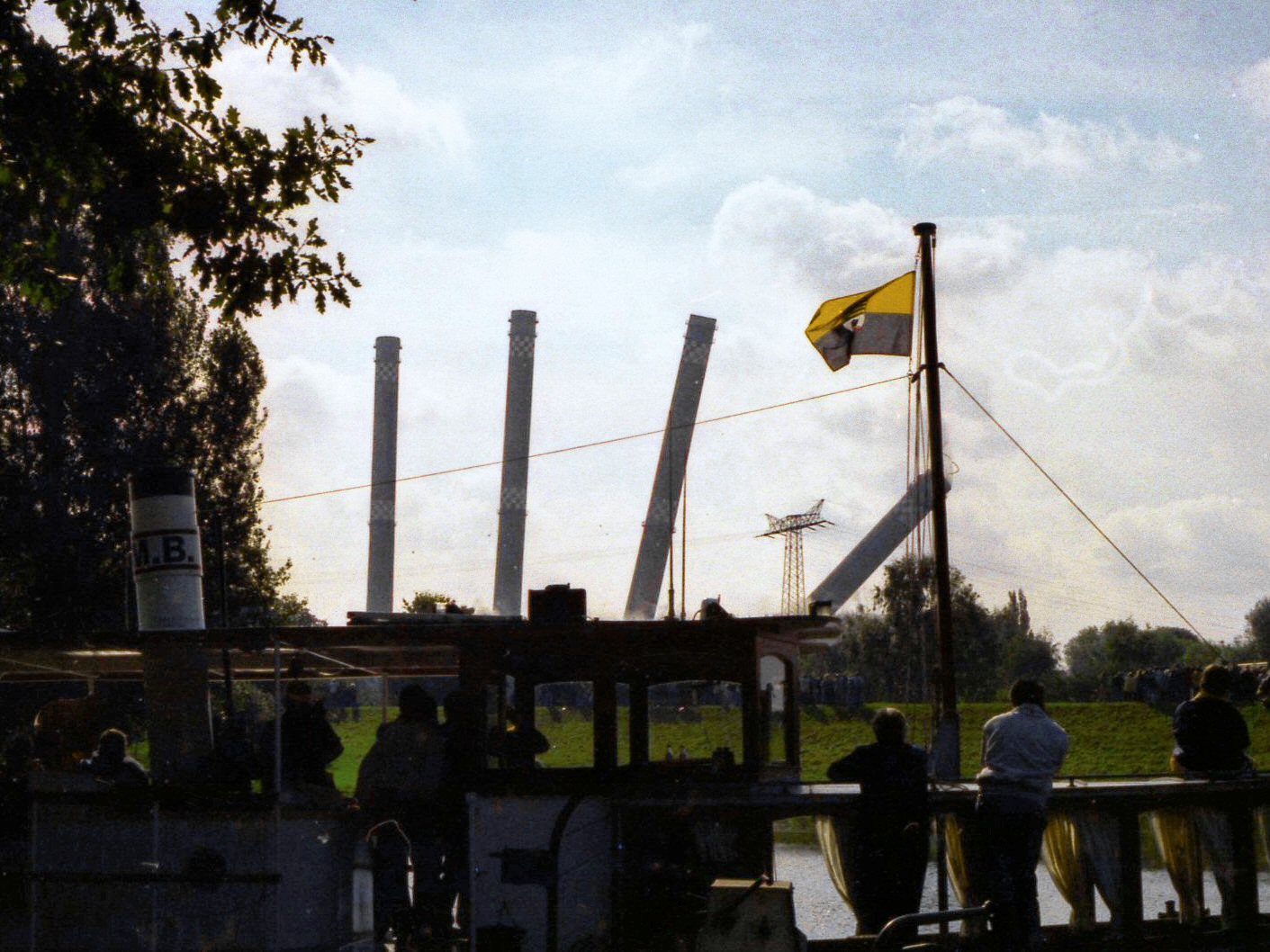
2001

Vockerode Power Plant (also called Elbe Power Plant) was a lignite and later also gas-fired power plant in Vockerode, East Germany. It was built in 1937 and shut-down between 1994 and 1998.

== History ==
Vockerode has been the site of a power plant for almost 60 years. While the four chimneys of the plant were demolished in 2001, much of the original building still exists today. Until 2013, it was used for events and art displays. Today, the plant is unsafe and closed to the public.

The first block of the lignite-fired power plant (6 x 35 MW) was built between 1937 and 1940. After 1943 installation was begun on the world's first commercial HVDC, the Elbe Project. It was completed in 1945, but never went in service. The power plant suffered no damage during World War II. After dismantling of the equipment during the soviet occupation the inverter hall was transformed into a workshop. A lot of equipment from the power plant was also dismantled. Between 1953 and 1959 the power plant was refurbished and a second block (12 x 36 MW) was built to provide for growing electricity demands of industry and households in the German Democratic Republic.

On July 22, 1960 an Ilyushin Il-14 plane of the GDR armed forces flying through dense fog scratched one of the chimneys and crashed. Seven people on board the plane and a worker on the ground were killed.

After 1968 the city of Dessau was supplied with heat from Vockerode Power Plant via a 15 kilometres long line. In 1971 a gas turbine power plant was built, which consisted of six 27 MW units. Between 1972 and 1974 greenhouse facilities were built on an area of 64 hectares, which were heated by the power plant, for growing tomatoes and cucumbers.

The green house facilities were shut down in 1991, and demolished in 1997. In 1994 the lignite power plant was shut down. In 1998 the gas turbine power plant was shut down and on September 22, 2001 the chimneys were demolished by explosives. In 2005 the oil tanks of the gas turbine plant were demolished.
