= Center for Scientific and Technical Creativity of the Youth =

Centers for Scientific and Technical Creativity of the Youth (Russian: Центры научно-технического творчества молодёжи, НТТМ, NTTM) were established in the late Soviet Union during perestroika as enterprises whose goal was commercialization of science and technology.

Other translations of the Russian term are Scientific and Technical Creativity of Youth Center, Youth Center for Scientific Creativity, etc.

The Centers were introduced by a joint decree of the USSR Council of Ministers, All-Union Central Council of Trade Unions, and Komsomol Central Committee no. 321 (March 13, 1987) "об образовании единой общегосударственной системы научно-технического творчества молодежи". They were established as subsidiaries of Komsomol raikoms.

The Centers enjoyed various benefits, including no taxes and only 3% contribution to the all-union fund.

The fortunes of quite a few "new Russians", notably Mikhail Khodorkovsky, arose from these Centers.

The Centers continue to exist in modern Russia.

Similar establishments were the Foundations of Youth Initiatives (фонды молодёжных инициатив, ФМИ).

== See also ==
- Youth Residential Complex
