= Moscow–Kashira HVDC transmission system =

HVDC transmission line in Russia

The Moscow–Kashira HVDC transmission system was an early high-voltage direct current (HVDC) connection between the town of Kashira and the city of Moscow in Russia, where the terminal was at 55°39′32″N 37°38′16″E. The system was built using mercury-arc valves and other equipment removed from the Elbe Project in Berlin at the end of World War II. Although primarily experimental in nature, the system was the first true static, electronic, high-voltage DC scheme to enter service. Earlier DC transmission schemes had either used electromechanical converters based on the Thury system, such as the Lyon–Moutiers DC transmission scheme or had been at only medium voltage, such as the 12 kV frequency converter scheme at Mechanicville, New York in the United States.

The scheme had a nominal power rating of 30 MW and was operated at different times as a bipole at ±100 kV or a monopole, with earth return, at 200 kV. For most of the transmission distance of 125 km, the transmission conductor was underground cable but some sections were converted to overhead line. The route of the line was between Kashira and Moscow parallel to the existing 110 kV overhead AC line.

Initial operating experience was gained using three series-connected, single anode mercury arc valves in each converter arm, but by 1959 experience had been gained with operating with either one or two mercury arc valves in series per arm.

The experience gained with multiple valves in series in each arm was not wholly successful and the little available literature suggests that the reliability of the scheme was poor. This may have been because the valves, unlike those being developed in Sweden by Dr Uno Lamm, lacked the external anode voltage divider networks which were found necessary to obtain reliable operation at high voltage.

Nevertheless the scheme provided valuable experience for designing the much larger ±400 kV Volgograd–Donbass project which was completed in 1965 using mercury arc valves of entirely Soviet design.

In 1969 the first thyristor valve built in the Soviet Union was installed in the converter . The scheme is however today not in use any more, whereby it is unknown when it was shut down. It is unknown, if the cable is still in place and if the converter hall in Kashira is still standing.

== See also ==
- List of HVDC projects
