= Elbe Project =

First commercial static high voltage direct current transmission system

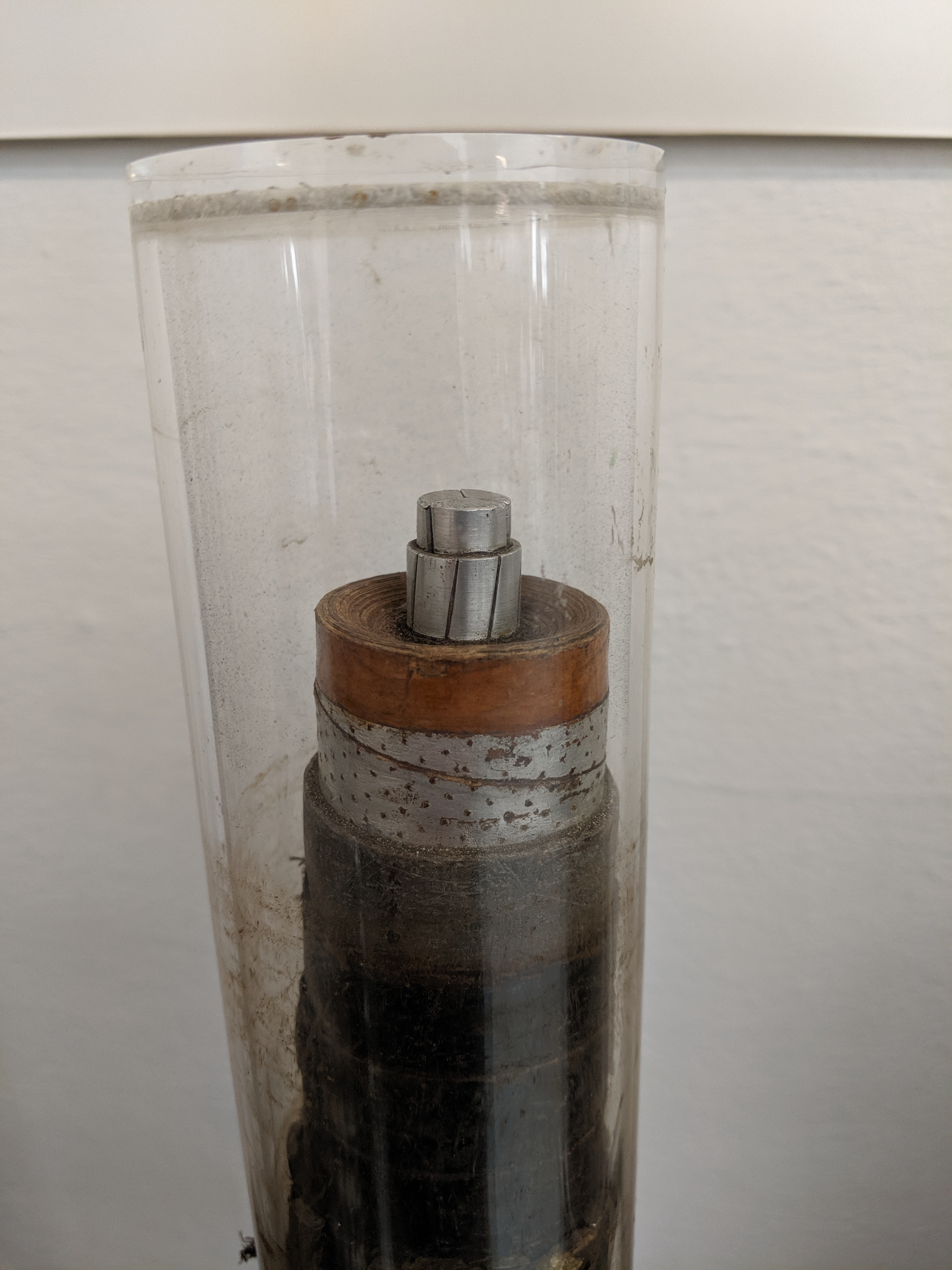
Piece of cable in the Deutsches Museum, Munich.

The Elbe Project (German: Elbe-Projekt) was the name of the first commercial, static high voltage direct current transmission system constructed in the world. The scheme was based on mercury arc valves.

Experimental installations between Wettingen and Zürich in Switzerland, and Charlottenburg and Moabit, Berlin, were demonstrated between 1933 and 1942. Contracts were signed with AEG and Siemens in 1941, and construction began of a bipolar direct current line from the Vockerode power station near Dessau on the Elbe, to Berlin-Marienfelde, in 1943. The line was designed to transmit 60 megawatts using a symmetrical bipolar operating voltage of +200 kV and −200 kV. Two single-core buried cables with aluminum conductors were used. A piece of the cable used can be seen in the Deutsches Museum, Munich.

The southern terminus was south of the Vockerode power plant. The hall built for this purpose (coordinates: 51°50'32"N 12°21'26"E) was later used as a workshop hall for the power plant and today houses some offices. The cable ran from Vockerode via Coswig, Straach, Boßdorf, Kropstädt, Treuenbrietzen, Beelitz, Michendorf, Saarmund and Großbeeren to the northern terminus in Berlin-Marienfelde. This was located in the area between the railway line from Berlin to Dresden, Beißlstrasse (until 1947 Wagemannstrasse), Friedrichsrodaer Strasse and Trachenbergring. The power converter hall built in this area (coordinates: 52°25'39"N 13°22'13"E) now serves as a sports hall. A 30 kV cable was laid from Berlin-Marienfelde to Steglitz substation (near Steglitz power plant), where the transmitted power should be fed into the power grid of Berlin.

A cable with an aluminum conductor with a cross section of 150 mm² and an outer diameter of 52 mm was used for each of the two high-voltage poles, while the earth was used as the neutral pole. For this purpose, there was close to both power converter stations a well equipped with a ground electrode. The exact location of these wells is no longer known.

The system was never put into service owing to the chaos in Germany at the end of World War II. The Soviets dismantled the system as part of war reparation payments, and reused it in building the 115 kilometre long 200 kV Moscow–Kashira monopolar high voltage direct current line with a maximum transmission rating of 30 megawatts in 1951. This transmission line is no longer operating.

== Sites ==
Site	Coordinates
Vockerode converter station (today workshop)	51°50′32″N 12°21′26″E
Berlin-Marienfelde converter station (today sports hall)	52°25′39″N 13°22′13″E
