= Student construction brigade =

Soviet, Belarusian and Russian student construction work team

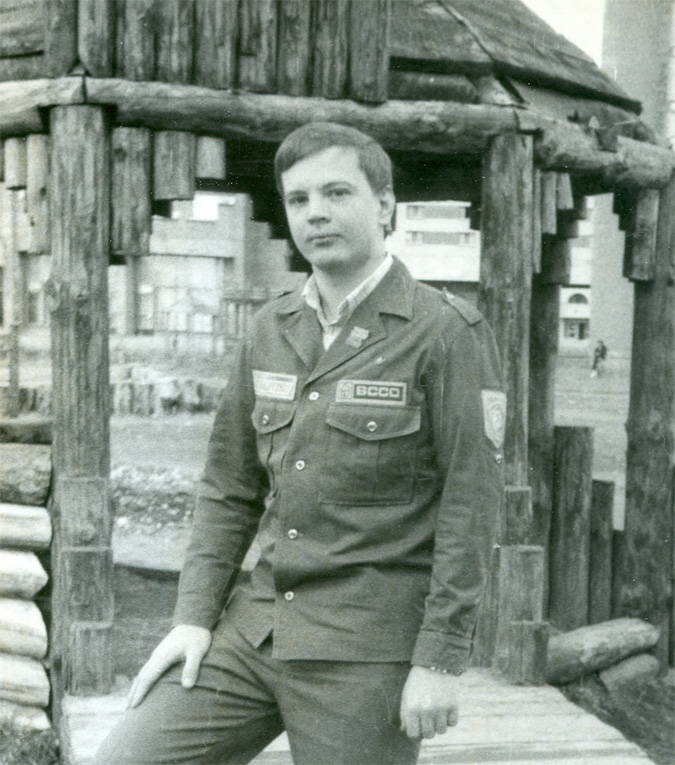
A Soviet SCB member in uniform

Student construction brigades (Russian: Студенческие строительные отряды (стройотряды, ССО, stroyotryad, SSO)) are temporary construction teams composed of students in universities and other institutions of higher education to work, usually during vacations. This form originated under the control of Komsomol of the Soviet Union.

The stroyotryad members had khaki/camouflage green-colored uniforms with chevrons and badges indicating the association.

There are efforts to revive the approach in modern Russia and Belarus.

== Soviet Union ==
Originated in 1959 at the Physics Department of the Moscow State University. From the mid-sixties they became an all-Union movement.

== Belarus ==
In Belarus, the student brigades enjoy privileges by decree #222 of President Lukashenko by May 12, 2006: they are free from income tax and use higher wage rates.

== Russia ==
The tradition of stroyotryads in Russia continued after the dissolution of the Soviet Union. Since 2003 there have been talks to revive the framework, with coordination and centralization. Expectations and attitudes are mixed.

Construction brigades in Russia were revived by efforts of the Young Guard of United Russia and Ministry of Education and Science of the Russian Federation and were active in preparation to the 2014 Winter Olympics in Sochi.

== See also ==
- Youth Residential Complex
- Shock construction project
