= Youth Residential Complex =

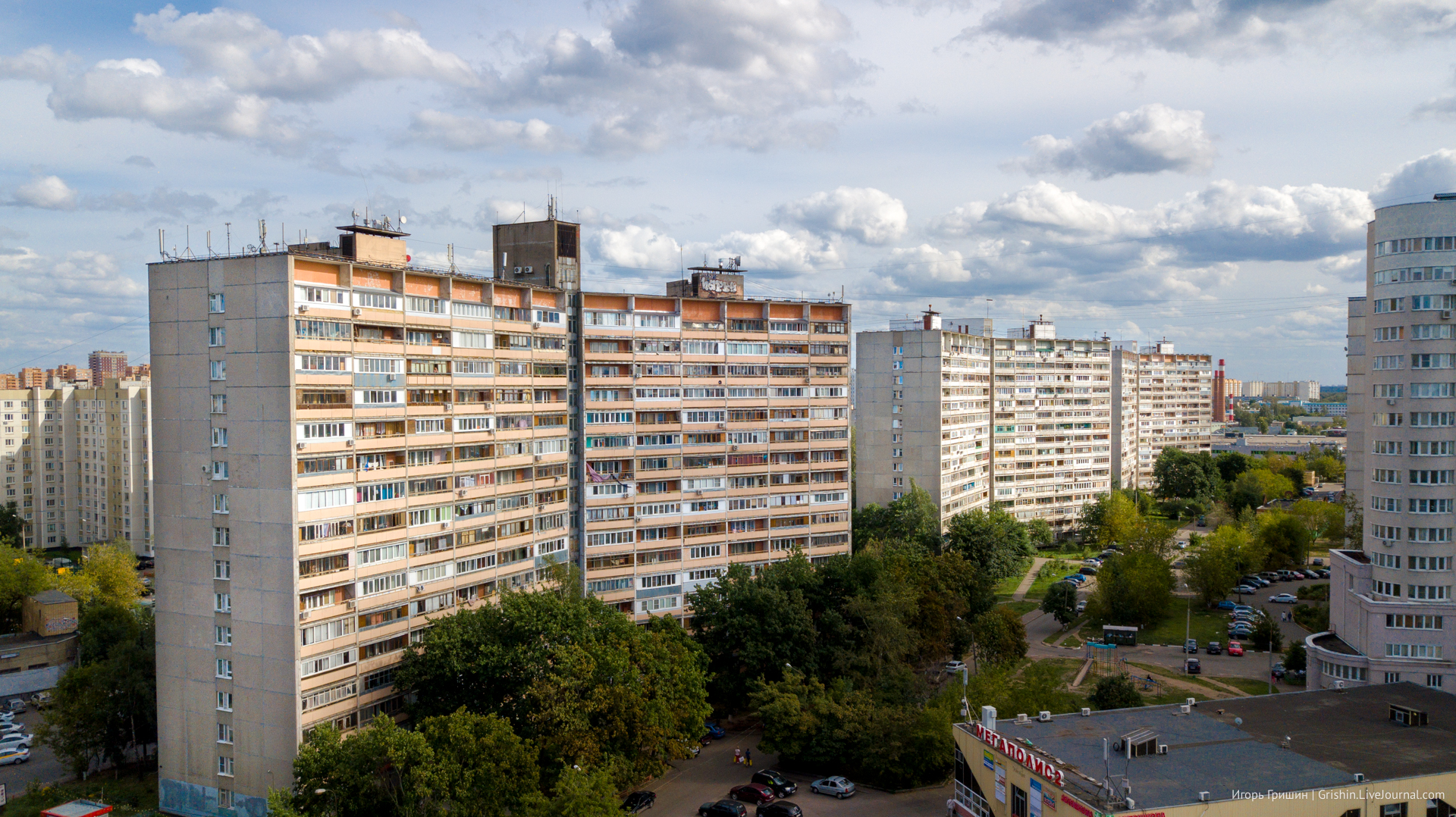
The first three book-shaped youth residential complex buildings in Korolyov seen in 2018

Youth Residential Complexes (Russian: молодёжный жилой комплекс, МЖК, MZhK) were housing projects intended for young families and constructed by their future tenants themselves, subsidized by industrial enterprises. This approach existed since 1971 and it was a mass movement until the dissolution of the Soviet Union. It was an attempt to alleviate the residential construction crisis in the late Soviet Union. Construction of Youth Residential Complexes continued in modern Russia, although based on a different business model, based on a market economy.

The first complex was built in Korolev City, one of Russian's naukograds (science cities).

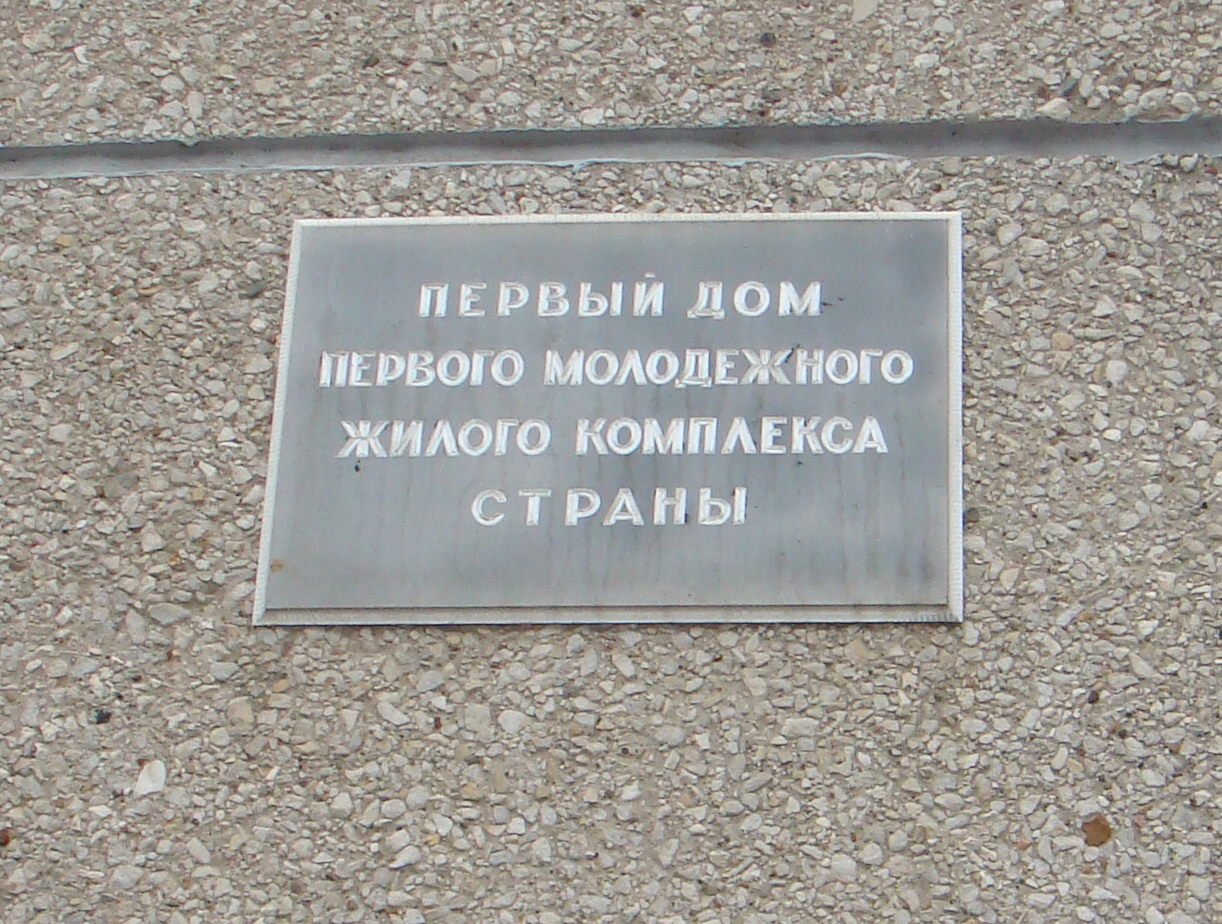
The nameboard of the first building of Youth Residential Complex (tr.:MZhK, Russian:МЖК) in USSR and World.

== See also ==
- Center for Scientific and Technical Creativity of the Youth
- Student construction brigade
