= HVDC Ekibastuz–Centre =

Location
- Country: Kazakhstan; Russia
- From: Ekibastuz, Kazakhstan
- To: Tambov, Russia

Construction information
- Construction started: 1978
- Expected: cancelled

Technical information
- Type: overhead line
- Current type: HVDC
- Total length: 2,414 km (1,500 mi)
- Capacity: 6,000 MW
- DC voltage: 750 kV

HVDC Ekibastuz–Centre is an unfinished HVDC transmission line between Ekibastuz in Kazakhstan and Tambov (Centre substation) in Russia whose construction was started in 1978. It was planned to have a length of 2,414 kilometres (1,500 mi), which would have made it the longest powerline of the world with a maximum transmission rate of 6,000 MW and a transmission voltage of 750 kV between conductor and ground (respectively 1,500 kV between conductors). For this line the erection of 4,000 pylons, most 41 metres (135 ft) tall, were required. Several hundred kilometres were built, including a Volga crossing on three 124 metres (407 ft) tall towers near Saratov, which were erected between 1989 and 1991. At Ekibastuz construction work at the terminal was started, while it was not the case at Centre substation, Tambov.

== Sites ==
- Centre Substation: 52°46′25″N 41°19′17″E
- Gryazi Substation 52°32′21″N 40°04′14″E
- Volga Crossing: 51°50′59″N 47°01′09″E
- Ekibastuz Electrode Line Branch: 49°46′44″N 74°16′13″E
- Ekibastuz HVDC Static Inverter Plant: 51°48′57″N 75°18′58″E
