= Subregion =

Part of a larger geographical region or continent

The United Nations geoscheme, created by the United Nations Statistics Division. For statistical consistency and convenience, each country or area is shown in one continental subregion only. For example, Russia (a transcontinental country in both Eastern Europe and Northern Asia) has been included in Eastern Europe only.

A subregion is a part of a larger geographical region or continent. Cardinal directions are commonly used to define subregions. There are many criteria for creating systems of subregions; this article is focusing on the United Nations geoscheme, which is a changing, constantly updated, UN tool based on specific political geography and demography considerations relevant in UN statistics.

== United Nations subregions ==
The Statistics Division of the United Nations (UN) is in charge of the collection, processing, and dissemination of statistical information for the UN. In 1999, it developed a system of macro-geographical (continental) regions, subregions, and other selected economic groups to report advances towards achieving numerous Millennium Development Goals worldwide. These statistical divisions were devised for statistical purposes and is used for carrying out statistical analysis. The division's first publication was the book World's Women 2000: Trends and Statistics in 2000.

According to the UN, the assignment of countries or areas to specific groupings is for statistical convenience and does not imply any assumption regarding political or other affiliation of countries or territories.

== Subregions by landmass and continent ==
The following is a non-exhaustive list of subregions, arranged alphabetically by region (i.e., by continent); in the UN geoscheme, higher-level, macro-geographical regions are arranged to the extent possible according to continents.

Sequence used in the list (not all criteria are applied to each continent):

- by the UN Statistics Division's geoscheme
- by geography
- by physiography
- by geopolitics
- by human geography
- by economics
- by culture
- by language
- by religion
- by biogeography
- by historical division
- by geology

=== Afro-Eurasia ===
Afro-Eurasia is a continental landmass comprising the continents of Africa, Asia, and Europe.

==== Africa ====
- by the United Nations Statistics Division's geoscheme (see also: UN geoscheme for Africa):
  - Northern Africa
  - Sub-Saharan Africa
    - Eastern Africa
    - Middle Africa
    - Southern Africa
    - Western Africa
- by geography:
  - North Africa (Also known as Saharan Africa)
    - Maghreb (AKA Northwest Africa, also including Mauritania, which most geographers consider as a part of West Africa; some geographers consider Libya as a part of Northeast Africa and Western Sahara as a part of West Africa)
    - Northeast Africa (including Egypt, the Horn of Africa, and the Sudans; some geographers consider Egypt, Libya, and the Sudan as Northeast Africa instead)
  - Sub-Saharan Africa (AKA Tropical Africa)
    - Central Africa (AKA Congo, Equatorial Africa or Middle Africa)
    - East Africa (AKA Nile)
      - Northeast Africa (including Egypt, the Horn of Africa, and the Sudans; some geographers consider Egypt, Libya, and the Sudan as Northeast Africa instead)
        - Horn of Africa
      - Southeast Africa (also including Botswana, Eswatini and Lesotho, which most geographers consider as part of Southern Africa)
    - Southern Africa (AKA Kalahari)
    - West Africa (AKA Niger)
      - Guinea (region)
      - Sudan (region)
- by physiography:
  - Congo Basin
  - Kalahari Basin
    - Kalahari Desert
  - Namib
  - Nile Basin
  - Sahara
  - Sahel
  - Sudanian savanna
    - East Sudanian savanna
      - Sudd
    - West Sudanian savanna
- by economics:
  - African Monetary Union (AMU)
  - Arab League (including some West Asian countries)
  - Common Market for Eastern and Southern Africa (COMESA)
  - Common Monetary Area (CMA)
  - Community of Sahel–Saharan States (CEN-SAD)
  - Council of Arab Economic Unity (GAFTA) – including some West Asian countries
  - Economic Community of Central African States (ECCAS)
  - Economic Community of West African States (ECOWAS)
  - EMEA (including Europe and the Middle East)
  - Southern African Customs Union (SACU)
  - Southern African Development Community (SADC)
  - Union for the Mediterranean (including most Southern European countries and some West Asian countries)
- by biogeography:
  - Macaronesia
- by historical division:
  - Negroland
- by geology:
  - Kaapvaal craton
  - Zimbabwe Craton

==== Eurasia ====
Eurasia is a continental mainland comprising the continents of Asia and Europe.

===== Asia =====
- by the United Nations Statistics Division's geoscheme (see also: UN geoscheme for Asia):
  - Central Asia
  - Eastern Asia
  - South-eastern Asia
  - Southern Asia – the UN geoscheme includes Afghanistan and Iran in this subregion
  - Western Asia – the UN geoscheme includes Cyprus, the South Caucasus (Armenia, Azerbaijan, and Georgia), and Turkey in this subregion
- by geography:
  - Central Asia
  - East Asia
    - Greater China
      - China
        - Hong Kong (some geographers consider it as a part of Northeast Asia)
        - Macau (some geographers consider it as a part of Northeast Asia)
        - Mainland China (some geographers consider it as a part of Northeast Asia)
          - North China (Eastern Inner Mongolia is also a part of Northeast China)
          - Northeast China (AKA Manchuria) – also a part of Northeast Asia
          - Southeast China (excluding Central China)
            - East China (some geographers include Taiwan Island, Penghu, Kinmen, the Matsu Islands, Socotra Rock, Parangcho, and the Senkaku Islands in this subregion)
            - South Central China
              - Central China
              - South China (including Hainan Island and the South China Sea Islands, some geographers also include Hong Kong and Macau in this subregion)
          - Western China
            - Northwest China (some geographers consider Qinghai and Xinjiang as part of Central Asia)
            - Southwest China (some geographers consider Tibet as a part of Central Asia)
      - South China Sea Islands (some geographers consider them as part of Northeast Asia)
        - Paracel Islands
        - Pratas Island
        - Spratly Islands
          - James Shoal (undersea feature)
          - Taiping Island
          - Zhongzhou Reef
        - Zhongsha Islands
          - Macclesfield Bank
            - Walker Shoal
          - Scarborough Shoal
      - Taiwan (some geographers consider it as a part of Northeast Asia)
    - Mongolia (some geographers consider it as a part of Central Asia or Northeast Asia)
    - Northeast Asia
      - China
        - Eastern Inner Mongolia
        - Northeast China (AKA Manchuria)
      - Japan
        - Daitō Islands
        - Mainland Japan
          - Hokkaido
          - Honshu
          - Kyushu
          - Shikoku
        - Nanpō Islands
        - Ryukyu Islands
      - Korea
        - North Korea
        - South Korea
      - Russian Far East (also a part of North Asia, but not a part of East Asia)
        - Outer Manchuria
  - North Asia (AKA Siberia)
    - Russian Far East (also a part of Northeast Asia)
      - Outer Manchuria
  - South Asia
    - Eastern South Asia
    - Northern South Asia
      - Northwestern Indian subcontinent
    - Southern South Asia
    - India
      - Andaman and Nicobar Islands
      - Lakshadweep
      - Mainland India
        - Central India
        - East India
        - Northeast India
        - North India
          - Northwest India
        - South India (AKA Peninsular India, including the Andaman and Nicobar Islands and Lakshadweep)
        - Western India
  - Southeast Asia
    - Mainland Southeast Asia
      - Malay Peninsula
        - Peninsular Malaysia
        - Southern Thailand
        - Tanintharyi Region
    - Maritime Southeast Asia
      - Borneo (including Labuan)
        - Brunei
        - East Malaysia
          - Labuan
          - Sabah
          - Sarawak
        - Kalimantan
  - West Asia (AKA Southwest Asia)
    - Anatolia (AKA Asia Minor)
    - Arabia
      - Eastern Arabia
      - Hejaz (AKA Western Arabia)
      - Najd (AKA Central Arabia)
      - South Arabia
    - Levant
      - Southern Levant
    - Mesopotamia
    - South Caucasus (AKA Transcaucasia)
- by physiography:
  - Anatolian Peninsula
  - Arabian Peninsula
    - Central Plateau
    - Indian Ocean Coast
    - Persian Gulf Coast
    - Red Sea Coast
  - Bahrain Island
  - Caucasus Mountains
    - Greater Caucasus
    - Lesser Caucasus
  - Daitō Islands
  - Eurasian Steppe
  - Fertile Crescent
    - Mesopotamia
  - Hainan Island
  - Himalayas
    - Eastern Himalaya
    - Western Himalaya
      - Siachen Glacier
  - Indian subcontinent
    - Deccan Plateau
  - Indochinese Peninsula
  - Indo-Gangetic Plain
  - Indus Valley
  - Iranian Plateau
  - Japanese archipelago
    - Hokkaido
    - Honshu
    - Kuril Islands
    - Kyushu
    - Ryukyu Islands
      - Okinawa Island
    - Sakhalin Island
    - Shikoku
  - Jeju Island
  - Junggar Basin
  - Kolyma
  - Korean Peninsula
  - Leizhou Peninsula
  - Liaodong Peninsula
  - Malay Archipelago (including New Guinea)
    - Indonesian Archipelago
      - Maluku Islands
      - Sunda Islands
        - Greater Sunda Islands
          - Borneo
          - Java
          - Sulawesi
          - Sumatra
        - Lesser Sunda Islands
          - Alor Archipelago
          - Bali
          - Barat Daya Islands
          - Flores
          - Komodo
          - Lombok
          - Sumba
          - Sumbawa
          - Tanimbar Islands
          - Timor
    - Philippine Archipelago
      - Luzon
      - Mindanao
      - Visayan Islands
  - Mongolian Plateau
  - Nanpō Islands
    - Bonin Islands
    - Volcano Islands
  - Qinghai Lake
  - Shandong Peninsula
  - Sichuan Basin
  - Sri Lanka Island
  - Taiwan Island
  - Tarim Basin
- by geopolitics:
  - Asia-Pacific (APAC) – including Oceania
    - Far East/Pacific Asia
      - Greater China
        - China proper
        - Inner Mongolia
        - Manchuria
        - Tibet
        - Xinjiang
      - Indochinese Peninsula
      - Japanese Archipelago
      - Korean Peninsula
      - Malay Archipelago
      - Russian Far East
  - Greater Middle East – including some African countries
    - Middle East and North Africa (AKA MENA) – including North African countries
      - Middle East (AKA the Near East) – including Egypt
        - Arab League (AKA the Arab states) – including some African countries
          - Mashriq – including Egypt and the Sudan
            - Arabian Peninsula
            - Levant – including Ash-Shām and Cyprus
            - Mesopotamia (modern-day Iraq)
        - Asia Minor
        - South Caucasus (AKA Transcaucasia)
    - The 'stans
  - Indian subcontinent
    - Himalayan states – including China
      - Eastern Himalaya
      - Western Himalaya
    - Kashmir
- by economics:
  - Arab League – including some African countries
  - ASEAN Free Trade Area
  - Asia Cooperation Dialogue (ACD) – including Russia
  - Asian Clearing Union (ACU)
  - Asia-Pacific Economic Cooperation (APEC) – including Oceania
  - Association of Southeast Asian Nations (ASEAN)
  - Bamboo network
  - Bangladesh, Bhutan, India, Nepal Initiative (BBIN)
  - Bay of Bengal Initiative for Multi-Sectoral Technical and Economic Cooperation (BIMSTEC)
  - Council of Arab Economic Unity (GAFTA) – including some African countries
  - EMEA (including Africa and Europe)
  - Eurasian Customs Union (ECU) – including Belarus
  - Eurasian Economic Union (EEU) – including Belarus
  - Greater Mekong Subregion
  - Gulf Cooperation Council (GCC)
  - South Asian Association for Regional Cooperation (SAARC)
  - South Asian Free Trade Area (SAFTA)
  - South Asia Subregional Economic Cooperation (SASEC)
  - Union for the Mediterranean (including most Southern European countries and North African countries)
- by culture:
  - Eastern world
    - East Asian cultural sphere
      - Greater China
        - Eastern and western China
          - Northern and southern China
            - China proper
            - Manchuria
      - Japan
      - Korea
      - Nanyang
      - Vietnam
      - Greater India
        - Eastern Afghanistan
        - Indian subcontinent
          - Himalayan states
            - Indian Himalayan Region
        - Mainland Southeast Asia
        - Maritime Southeast Asia
        - Tibet
        - Yunnan
    - Greater Mongolia
      - Inner Mongolia
      - Mongolia (Outer Mongolia)
  - Muslim world (AKA the Islamic world)
    - Arab world
      - Mashriq
        - Arabia
          - Al-Bahrain
          - Al-Yamama
          - Hadhramaut
          - Tihamah
    - Malay world
      - Greater Indonesia
        - Nusantara
    - Turkic world
      - Azerbaijan
      - Soviet Central Asia (excluding Tajikistan)
      - Turkey
      - Xinjiang
        - Dzungaria (northern half of Xinjiang)
        - Southern Xinjiang
    - Greater Iran
      - Greater Khorasan
- by religion:
  - Abrahamic religions (West Asian religions or Western religions)
  - Eastern religions
    - Dharmic religions (Indian religions)
    - Taoic religions (East Asian religions or Far Eastern religions)
- by biogeography:
  - Eastern Asia
  - Malesia
- by historical division:
  - East Indies (AKA the Indies)
    - Farther India (AKA Ultraindia)
      - Indochina
      - Insulindia
- by geology:
  - Izu–Bonin–Mariana Arc
  - Kuril Island Arc
  - Northeastern Japan Arc
  - Ryukyu Island Arc
  - Sakhalin Island Arc
  - Southwestern Japan Arc

===== Europe =====
- by the United Nations Statistics Division's geoscheme (see also: UN geoscheme for Europe):
  - Eastern Europe – the UN geoscheme includes parts of Central Europe (Czechia, Hungary, Poland, and Slovakia), parts of South-eastern Europe (Bulgaria and Romania), and Northern Asia (Siberia) in this subregion
  - Northern Europe – the UN geoscheme includes the Baltic states, the British Isles, and the Channel Islands in this subregion
  - Southern Europe – the UN geoscheme includes Slovenia in this subregion
  - Western Europe – the UN geoscheme includes parts of Central Europe (the DACH countries and Liechtenstein) in this subregion
- by geography:
  - Central and Eastern Europe
    - Central Europe
    - Eastern Europe
      - Caucasus
        - North Caucasus (aka Ciscaucasia)
        - South Caucasus (aka Transcaucasia) – a subregion of West Asia
  - Northern Europe
    - North-central Europe
      - Scandinavia
    - North-eastern Europe
    - North-western Europe
  - Southern Europe
    - South-central Europe
      - Apennine Peninsula (aka the Italian Peninsula)
      - Malta
    - South-eastern Europe
      - Balkan Peninsula (aka the Balkans)
      - Romania
    - South-western Europe
      - Balearic Islands
      - Iberian Peninsula (aka Iberia)
      - Southern France
  - Western Europe
- by physiography:
  - Apennine Peninsula (aka the Italian Peninsula)
  - Balkan Peninsula
  - British Isles
    - Great Britain
    - Hebrides
    - Ireland
    - Isle of Man
    - Isle of Wight
  - Caucasus Mountains
    - Greater Caucasus
    - Lesser Caucasus – A part of West Asia
  - Channel Islands
    - Guernsey
    - Jersey
  - Eurasian Steppe
  - Fennoscandian Peninsula
    - Kola Peninsula
    - Scandinavian Peninsula
  - Great European Plain
    - East European Plain
  - Iberian Peninsula
  - Mediterranean Basin
- by geopolitics:
  - East-Central Europe
  - Eastern Europe
    - Post-Soviet states
      - Baltic states
      - Commonwealth of Independent States
        - Union State
          - North Caucasus
      - Georgia
      - Ukraine
  - West-Central Europe (in German)
  - Western Europe
    - European Union (EU)
    - NATO
    - North Sea Commission (NSC)
- by economics:
  - Central European Free Trade Agreement (CEFTA)
  - Commonwealth of Independent States Free Trade Area (CISFTA) – including Armenia and most Central Asian countries
  - Comprehensive Economic and Trade Agreement (CETA) – including Canada
  - EMEA (including Africa and the Middle East)
  - Eurasian Customs Union (EACU) – including Armenia and Kyrgyzstan
  - Eurasian Economic Union (EAEU) – including Armenia and Kyrgyzstan
  - European Economic Area (EEA) – including Cyprus
  - European Free Trade Association (EFTA)
  - European Single Market (including Cyprus)
  - European Union Customs Union (EUCU) – including Cyprus and Turkey
  - European Union–Turkey Customs Union (including Cyprus and Turkey)
  - Eurozone (including Cyprus)
  - North Sea Region (NSR)
  - Union for the Mediterranean (UfM) – including some West Asian countries and most North African countries
  - Union State
- by culture:
  - Balkans
    - Eastern Balkans
    - Western Balkans
  - Baltic states
  - Benelux
    - Belgium
    - Netherlands
    - Luxembourg
  - Mediterranean Region
  - Nordic countries and Karelia
  - North Sea Region
  - Lapland, since 1809 divided into Finnish Lapland and Swedish Lapland
  - Scandinavia
  - Visegrád Group
- by language:
  - Celtic-speaking Europe
  - Germanic-speaking Europe
    - DACH countries
      - Germany (Deutschland)
      - Austria
      - Switzerland (Confoederatio Helvetica)
  - Romance-speaking Europe (aka Latin Europe)
  - Slavic-speaking Europe
- by religion:
  - Eastern religions
    - Indian religions
      - Buddhism in Europe (Kalmykia)
  - Western religions (Abrahamic religions or West Asian religions)
    - Christianity in Europe
      - Catholicism in Europe
      - Eastern Orthodoxy in Europe
      - Protestantism in Europe
    - Islam in Europe
- by biogeography:
  - Mediterranean Region
- by historical division:
  - Celtic tribes
  - East–West Schism
    - Catholic Church
    - Eastern Orthodox Church
  - Germanic tribes
  - Greco-Roman world
    - Hellenistic world
    - Roman Empire
      - Eastern Roman Empire
      - Western Roman Empire
  - Iranian tribes
  - Iron Curtain
    - Eastern Bloc
    - Western Bloc
  - Reformation (Protestantism)
  - Slavic tribes
  - Turkic tribes
- by geology:
  - Alpine orogeny
  - East European craton
    - Baltic Shield
    - Ukrainian Shield

=== Americas ===
The Americas is a continental landmass comprising the continents of North America and South America.

- by the United Nations Statistics Division's geoscheme (see also: UN geoscheme for the Americas):
  - Latin America and the Caribbean
    - Caribbean – the UN includes the Lucayan Archipelago in this subregion
    - Central America – the UN geoscheme includes Mexico in this subregion
    - Middle America
    - South America
  - Northern America
- by culture:
  - Anglo-America
  - Latin America
    - French America
    - Ibero-America
      - Hispanic America
      - Portuguese America
- by economics:
  - Community of Latin American and Caribbean States (CELAC)

==== North America ====
- by geography:
  - Middle America
    - Caribbean (Insular America)
      - Aves Island
      - West Indies
        - Antilles
          - Greater Antilles
            - Hispaniola
          - Lesser Antilles
            - Leeward Islands
              - Saint Martin island
              - SSS islands
              - Virgin Islands
                - British Virgin Islands
                - Spanish Virgin Islands
                - United States Virgin Islands
              - Leeward Antilles
                - ABC islands
              - Windward Islands
        - Lucayan Archipelago
      - Central America
        - San Andrés and Providencia
          - Bajo Nuevo Bank
          - Serranilla Bank
      - Mexico
  - Northern America
    - Bermuda
    - Canada
      - Eastern Canada
        - Atlantic Canada
          - The Maritimes
        - Central Canada
      - Northern Canada
        - Canadian Arctic Archipelago
      - Western Canada
        - Canadian Prairies
        - West Coast
    - Greenland
    - Saint Pierre and Miquelon
    - United States (excluding Hawaii)
      - Alaska
      - Contiguous United States
        - Central United States
          - Middle America (United States)
          - Midwestern United States
        - Eastern United States
          - Northeastern United States
          - Southeastern United States
        - Northern United States
          - Great Lakes region (including Ontario, Canada)
        - Southern United States
          - South Central United States
        - Western United States (including Alaska and Hawaii)
          - Northwestern United States
          - Southwestern United States (some geographers include the Oklahoma Panhandle and West Texas in this subregion)
- by physiography:
  - Atlantic coastal plain
  - Atlantic Seaboard Fall Line
  - East Coast of the United States
  - Great Basin
  - Great Basin Desert
  - Great Lakes
  - Great Lakes Basin
  - Great Plains
  - Gulf Coast of the United States
  - Piedmont
  - West Coast of the United States
- by geopolitics:
  - Dutch Caribbean
    - Caribbean Netherlands (AKA the BES islands)
  - Organisation of Eastern Caribbean States
  - Red states and blue states
  - Western Caribbean zone
- by economics:
  - Caribbean Community (CARICOM)
  - Central America Free Trade Agreement (CAFTA)
  - Great Lakes Megalopolis
  - Mesoamerican region
  - North American Free Trade Agreement (NAFTA)
  - Northeast megalopolis
  - Organisation of Eastern Caribbean States
  - Petrocaribe
- by culture:
  - Heartland (United States)
  - Mesoamerica
  - Oasisamerica
- by biogeography:
  - Aridoamerica
- by geology:
  - Canadian Shield
  - North American craton
  - Slave craton
  - Superior craton
  - Wyoming craton

==== South America ====
- by geography:
  - Eastern South America: Federative Republic of Brazil
  - Northern South America – the part of South America located in the Northern Hemisphere
    - North-eastern South America: The Guianas
    - North-western South America: Caribbean South America
  - Southern South America: Southern Cone
  - Western South America: Andean States
- by physiography:
  - Altiplano
  - Amazon basin
  - Amazon rainforest
  - Andes
  - Brazilian Highlands
  - Gran Chaco
  - Pampa
  - Pantanal
  - Patagonia
- by economics:
  - Andean Community
  - Mercosur
  - Union of South American Nations
- by geology:
  - Guiana Shield

=== Antarctica ===
- by the United Nations Statistics Division's geoscheme:
  - Antarctica
- by geography:
  - Antarctic and Subantarctic islands
    - Bouvet Island (some geographers consider it as a part of South America)
    - French Southern Territories (excluding Adélie Land and the Scattered Islands)
      - Crozet Islands (some geographers consider them as part of Africa)
      - Kerguelen Islands (some geographers consider them as part of Africa)
      - Saint Paul and Amsterdam Islands (some geographers consider them as part of Africa)
    - Heard Island and McDonald Islands (some geographers consider them as part of Oceania)
    - Macquarie Island (some geographers consider it as a part of Oceania)
    - New Zealand Subantarctic Islands (some geographers consider them as part of Oceania)
      - Antipodes Islands
      - Auckland Islands
      - Bounty Islands
      - Campbell Islands
      - Snares Islands
    - Peter I Island
    - Prince Edward Islands (some geographers consider them as part of Africa)
    - South Georgia and the South Sandwich Islands (some geographers consider them as part of South America)
    - South Orkney Islands
    - South Shetland Islands
  - Mainland Antarctica
    - East Antarctica
    - Transantarctic Mountains
    - West Antarctica
      - Antarctic Peninsula

=== Oceania ===
- by the United Nations Statistics Division's geoscheme (see also: UN geoscheme for Oceania):
  - Australia and New Zealand – the UN geoscheme includes the Cato, Elizabeth, and Middleton reefs, the Lord Howe Island Group, and Norfolk Island in this subregion
  - Melanesia – the UN geoscheme includes New Caledonia and New Guinea in this subregion
  - Micronesia
  - Polynesia – the UN excludes New Zealand from this subregion
- by geography:
  - Australasia
    - Australia–New Guinea
      - Australia (excluding the Australian Indian Ocean Territories, Heard Island and McDonald Islands and Norfolk Island)
        - Ashmore and Cartier Islands
        - Coral Sea Islands Territory (excluding the Cato, Elizabeth, and Middleton reefs)
        - Mainland Australia
          - Australian Capital Territory
          - Jervis Bay Territory
          - New South Wales (excluding the Lord Howe Island Group)
          - Northern Territory
          - Queensland
          - South Australia
          - Victoria
          - Western Australia
        - Tasmania (excluding Macquarie Island)
      - New Guinea (some geographers consider it as a part of Melanesia)
        - Papua New Guinea (excluding the New Guinea Islands Region)
        - Western New Guinea
          - Papua
          - West Papua
    - Australian Indian Ocean Territories
      - Christmas Island
      - Cocos (Keeling) Islands
    - Heard Island and McDonald Islands
      - Heard Island
      - McDonald Islands
    - Macquarie Island
    - Zealandia
      - Cato Reef
      - Elizabeth Reef
      - Lord Howe Island Group
      - Middleton Reef
      - New Caledonia (also a part of Melanesia)
      - New Zealand (some geographers consider it as a part of Polynesia)
        - New Zealand outlying islands (excluding the Kermadec Islands)
          - Chatham Islands
          - New Zealand Subantarctic Islands
            - Antipodes Islands
            - Auckland Islands
            - Bounty Islands
            - Campbell Islands
            - Snares Islands
          - Solander Islands
          - Three Kings Islands
      - Norfolk Island
  - Pacific Islands
    - Melanesia (some geographers consider it as a part of Australasia)
      - Island Melanesia
        - Fiji (excluding Rotuma)
        - New Caledonia (also a part of Zealandia)
        - New Guinea Islands Region (excluding Bougainville)
        - Santa Cruz Islands
        - Solomon Islands (archipelago)
          - Bougainville
          - Solomon Islands (excluding the Santa Cruz Islands)
        - Vanuatu
      - New Guinea (also a part of Australia–New Guinea)
    - Micronesia (some geographers include the Bonin Islands and the Volcano Islands in this subregion)
      - Mariana Islands
        - Guam
        - Northern Mariana Islands
      - Wake Island
    - Polynesia (some geographers include Clipperton Island in this subregion)
      - Cook Islands
      - Easter Island
        - Salas and Gómez Island
      - French Polynesia
        - Tahiti
      - Hawaiian Islands
        - Northwestern Hawaiian Islands
          - Midway Atoll
        - Southeastern Hawaiian Islands
      - Howland and Baker Islands
        - Baker Island
        - Howland Island
      - Kermadec Islands
      - Niue
      - Pitcairn, Henderson, Ducie and Oeno Islands
      - Rotuma
      - Samoan Islands
        - American Samoa (excluding Swains Island)
        - Samoa
      - Tokelau Islands
        - Swains Island
        - Tokelau
      - Tonga
      - Tuvalu
      - Wallis and Futuna
        - Alo
        - Sigave
        - Uvea
- by human geography:
  - Near Oceania
  - Remote Oceania
- by economics:
  - Pacific Community
  - Pacific Islands Forum
  - Pacific Regional Environment Programme
- by biogeography:
  - Papuasia
    - East Melanesian Islands
- by geology (see also: Geology of Australia):
  - Archaean
  - Australian Shield
  - Centralian Superbasin
  - Gawler craton
  - Narryer gneiss
  - Ore genesis
  - Perth Basin
  - Pilbara Craton
  - Western Plateau
  - Yilgarn craton

== See also ==
- Autonomous administrative division
- Continent
- Continental fragment
- European Committee of the Regions
- Euroregion
- List of continents and continental subregions by population
- List of Latin names of regions
- Military district
- Polar regions of Earth
- Region
- Regional district
- Regional municipality
- Subcontinent
- Submerged continent
- Supercontinent
- United Nations geoscheme
