= POWER cluster =

- Classification: Interreg project
- Interreg branch: Transnational (IVB)
- Programme: North Sea Region Programme
- Duration: 2008-2011
- Budget: 5 million EUR
- Homepage: www.power-cluster.net

POWER cluster is a project that aims to establish a business cluster for offshore wind power in the North Sea Region. It is part-funded by the North Sea Region Programme which is part of the transnational branch (IVB) of Interreg, one of the regional policy instruments of the European Union under the European Regional Development Fund (ERDF). It is the successor of the POWER project funded under Interreg IIIB.

POWER cluster is led by the Bremerhaven Economic Development Company in Germany together with 17 other participants from Germany, United Kingdom, Denmark, The Netherlands, Norway and Sweden.

== Offshore wind power ==
Compared to onshore wind power, offshore wind power is more complex and costly to install and maintain but also has several key advantages. Winds are typically stronger and more stable at sea, resulting in significantly higher production per unit installed. Wind turbines can also be bigger than on land because it is easier to transport very large turbine components by sea. Offshore wind farms also have less potential to cause concern among neighbouring residents.

The wind resources over Europe's seas represent a vast, local source of clean, renewable energy. By generating electricity without fossil fuels and by creating jobs in a sector in which some European businesses are global leaders, offshore wind can contribute to reduced greenhouse gas emissions, to ensuring security of supply and to improving EU competitiveness.

== Project objectives ==
- Developing an offshore wind power cluster in the North Sea Region (NSR)
- Adapting and preparing the NSR workforce to the needs of offshore wind energy
- Creating a business platform to foster offshore wind energy development in the NSR
- Communicating the benefits of offshore wind energy to the public

== Project partners ==
The lead beneficiary of the POWER cluster project is the Bremerhaven Economic Development Company in Germany. Furthermore, there are 17 beneficiaries from six countries participating in the project.

No.	Participant	Country
1	BIS Bremerhaven Economic Development Company Ltd.	Germany
2	SUBVE The Senator for Environment, Construction, Transport and European; Affairs, Free State of Bremen	Germany
3	University of Applied Sciences Bremerhaven	Germany
4	Technical College Bremerhaven	Germany
5	University of Oldenburg	Germany
6	Foundation Offshore Wind Energy	Germany
7	Ministry for Science, Economics and Transport, State of Schleswig-Holstein	Germany
8	WAK SH Academy of Economics of Schleswig-Holstein	Germany
9	Suffolk County Council	United Kingdom
10	EEEGR East of England Energy Group	United Kingdom
11	Northumberland College	United Kingdom
12	SDEO Southern Denmark European Office	Denmark
13	Offshore Center Danmark	Denmark
14	Aalborg University	Denmark
15	Delft University of Technology	Netherlands
16	Greater Stavanger	Norway
17	Chalmers University of Technology	Sweden
18	Municipality of Öckerö	Sweden
