= Zhongsha (disambiguation) =

Zhongsha (Chinese: 中沙, p Zhōngshā) is the Chinese name for the Macclesfield Bank in the South China Sea.

Zhongsha may also refer to:

- The Zhongsha Islands, other submerged sea features around the Macclesfield Bank
- Zhongsha District, a Chinese county-level area responsible for "administration" of these features
- Zhongsha, Shanghai, part of the Jiuduansha shoals off Pudong
