= East Asia Economic Caucus =

The East Asia Economic Caucus (EAEC) or East Asia Economic Group (EAEG) was a regional free trade zone (FTA) proposed in 1997 by Malaysian Prime Minister Mahathir Mohamad and encompasses most nations of East and Southeast Asia (ESEA). However, Japan at the time refused participation due to the exclusion of the United States, which at the time had tariffs on each other, has an economy too deeply interlinked through trade, and was still reeling from the effects of the Japanese asset price bubble. They also added that they were already members of the Asia-Pacific Economic Cooperation (APEC) and many other notable regional organizations in ESEA. South Korea was also extremely dissatisfied with the idea of placing Japan at the center of the proposed organization due to historical connotations.

The EAEC was a reaction to ASEAN's integration into APEC by Mahathir, who is known for his strong Pan-Asian standpoint. His suggestion apparently articulated his dissatisfaction with ASEAN joining APEC, which includes Western nations, an idea he was strongly opposed to. Therefore, EAEC was basically an APEC without Northern America and Oceania. Nevertheless, it was never put into action officially.

When ASEAN+3 was institutionalized in 1999, it was considered the successor of EAEC, which prompted Malaysia to declare that the EAEC has nevertheless still been realized. In 2005, with Japan's support of the ASEAN+3 agreement, it was agreed in return to include Australia, New Zealand, and India into the East Asia Summit, a separate organization.

More recently, the Regional Comprehensive Economic Partnership (RCEP) has also been considered identical to the EAEC, except this time with the inclusion of Australia and New Zealand. The RCEP is the first free trade agreement which included China, Indonesia, Japan, and South Korea together, four of the five largest economies in ESEA. The partnership is notable over the absence of the United States. Several analysts have predicted that the RCEP has the potential to leave the U.S. behind in economic and political affairs within the next few decades especially in the Asia-Pacific.

== Origin ==
When the Uruguay Round of discussions to create more liberalized world trade was aborted in autumn 1997, the Malaysian Prime Minister Mahathir Mohammad attempted to create such a trade union in ESEA which was a much debated approach to institutionalizing regional ESEA structures.

== Reactions ==
The Western-critical speech by Mahathir without consultations with his colleagues in other states resulted in some apprehension by some Asian countries from this idea. Japan especially, felt compromised by this due to its geopolitical situation. Mahathir tried to support the idea by stressing that the EAEC conforms with the General Agreement on Tariffs and Trade (GATT), but this step also brought hardly any results. The exclusion of Oceania was also found especially unfitting. Japan could not go along with this, not at least during the beginning of the 1990s, as it was re-orienting itself after the complete collapse of the Eastern Bloc amid the Revolutions of 1989 and the end of the Cold War.

== Perspectives ==
As a result, the original concept of EAEC was very difficult to implement. Besides these difficulties, Mahathir's concept committed Japan to be the leading power. However, Japan could not afford such a perspective at the time, as it was closely allied to the United States since its defeat in World War II five decades prior, and as a result has an economy deeply linked through trade ever since. South Korea was also extremely dissatisfied with Japan being placed at the center of the proposed organization due to the historical connotations of Japan ruling over Korean economic affairs, and would not support the possibility of Japanese economic hegemony in the region.

== Countries intended to be involved ==
The countries that were supposed to compose the East Asia Economic Caucus were:

- Brunei
- China
- Indonesia
- Japan
- Laos
- Malaysia
- Myanmar
- Philippines
- Singapore
- Republic of Korea
- Thailand
- Vietnam

== See also ==
- East Asia Summit
- East Asian Community
- Regional Comprehensive Economic Partnership
- Pacific Asia
