= Novy Vostok =

Oriental studies magazine in the Soviet Union (1922–1930)

- Categories: Oriental studies magazine
- Founder: All Union Scientific Association for Oriental Studies
- Founded: 1922
- Final issue: 1930
- Country: Soviet Union
- Based in: Moscow
- Language: Russian

Novy Vostok (Russian: New Orient or New East) was a Russian language semi-official Soviet Oriental studies magazine which existed between 1922 and 1930. It was the organ of the All Union Scientific Association for Oriental Studies (VNAV).

== History and profile ==
Novy Vostok was started by the VNAV in Moscow in 1922. The VNAV was also established the same year and headed by M. Pavlovich Veltman, pseudonym of Mikhail Veltman. The magazine was a semi-official review, and in the first issue the editorial declared that Asian territories had been part of Russia which was also an Asian state. Novy Vostok featured articles on the Oriental studies which guided the activities of the Soviet policy makers. Political events in not only Asian countries but also Arab countries were discussed in detail in the magazine. It also covered discussions about the internal topics such as the role of national bourgeoisie. One of the contributors was Viktor Arkadevich May who published articles under the pseudonym Mokhtadir Sendzhabi.

Novy Vostok folded in 1930 after producing a total of 28 issues. There was no significant publication concerning the Oriental studies in the Soviet until the end of World War II.
