= Asia-Pacific region (disambiguation) =

The Asia-Pacific region (or Asia Pacific region) is a geographic designation.

It may also refer to:

- Asia-Pacific Scout Region (World Organization of the Scout Movement)
- Pacific Rim, countries and cities located around the edge of the western Pacific Ocean
  - Pacific Asia, the east coast of Asia
