= Northwestern Europe =

Geographical region

Map of the countries included in a minimum definition of Northwestern Europe

Northwestern Europe, or Northwest Europe, is a loosely defined subregion of Europe, overlapping Northern and Western Europe. The term is used in geographic, history, and military contexts.

== Geographic definitions ==
Geographically, Northwestern Europe is given by some sources as a region which includes Great Britain, Ireland, Belgium, the Netherlands, Luxembourg, Northern France, parts of or all of Germany, Denmark, Norway, Sweden, and Iceland. In some works, Switzerland, Finland, and Austria are also included as part of Northwestern Europe.

Under the Interreg program, funded by the European Regional Development Fund, "North-West Europe" (NWE) is a region of European Territorial Cooperation that includes Belgium, Ireland, Luxembourg, Switzerland, the Netherlands and parts of France and Germany.

== Ethnography ==
During the Reformation, some parts of Northwestern Europe converted to Protestantism, in a manner which differentiated the region from its Roman Catholic neighbours elsewhere in Europe.

A definition of Northwestern Europe was used by some late 19th to mid-20th century anthropologists, eugenicists, and Nordicists, who used the term as a shorthand term for the part of Europe with a predominantly Nordic population. For example, Arthur de Gobineau, the 19th-century aristocrat who published works on the pseudoscience of scientific racism, included parts of Northwestern Europe in what Leon Baradat described as his "Aryan heaven".

== Genetics ==
There is close genetic affinity among some Northwest European populations, with some of these populations descending from Bell Beaker populations carrying steppe ancestry. For example, the Beaker people of the lower Rhine overturned 90% of Great Britain's gene pools, replacing the Basque-like Neolithic populations present prior.

== See also ==
- Atlantic Europe
- Germanic-speaking Europe
- North Sea Region
- North West Europe campaign
