= Milkshed =

Milk producing region

Milkshed, Milk shed, or Milk-shed, is a region producing milk that may be supplied to the area of demand without spoiling. It is an area geographically demarcated for the collection of milk or milk products. Due to increases in technology the milk shed has grown from 30 mile radius to over 300 miles. Thus, nearly every farm in the Northeastern United States and Northwest Europe are in at least one milkshed.

== Origin ==
The term milkshed originated in America around 1925-1930 on the model of "watershed". The milkshed was created due to the use of railroads as a method of transporting milk around the country.
