= List of sovereign states and dependent territories in Asia =

This is a list of sovereign states and dependent territories in Asia. It includes fully recognized states, states with limited but substantial international recognition, de facto states with little or no international recognition, and dependencies of both Asian and non-Asian states. In particular, it lists (i) 49 generally recognized sovereign states, all of which are members of the United Nations; (ii) two states with substantial but not general international recognition, one of which is a United Nations General Assembly non-member observer state; (iii) three largely unrecognized de facto states; and (iv) six dependent and other territories.

The 49 generally recognized sovereign states listed here include two countries that are generally classified as European or African nations but with portions of their territory being in Asia, while the two states with substantial but not general recognition are both fully encompassed in Asia. Though a majority of the Russian Federation's land area is located within Asia, it is generally considered a European country because of its historical, cultural, ethnic, and political ties to Europe. Its capital and largest city, Moscow is located within Europe, and the vast majority of its population lives within its European part. South Caucasus countries (Armenia, Azerbaijan, Georgia), Turkey, and Cyprus are also often considered part of Europe based on political, economic, and historical-cultural criteria. In addition, while Egypt extends into Asia through the Sinai Peninsula, it is generally considered to be an African country because most of its population and geographic area is in Africa.

== Geographical boundaries of Asia ==

The divisions between Asia and Europe occur at the Ural Mountains, Ural River, and Caspian Sea in the east, the Caucasus Mountains and the Black Sea, Bosporus Sea of Marmara, Dardanelles and the Aegean Sea in the south. Azerbaijan, Georgia, Greece, Kazakhstan, Russia, and Turkey all have territory in both Asia and Europe. Armenia and Cyprus are entirely in Western Asia but are socio-politically European countries and members of the Council of Europe, with Cyprus also being a member of the European Union. Georgia and Turkey are both considered EU candidate countries situated on Asian and European territories.

The division between Asia and Africa is normally considered to be the Suez Canal, placing the Sinai peninsula (which is part of Egypt) in Asia. Therefore, Egypt, an African country, may also be considered to be a country in Asia.

The division between Southeast Asia and Australia/Oceania is disputed and currently placed somewhere between Java and New Guinea. Indonesia spans both areas, but is ordinarily considered to be an Asian country. Timor-Leste is sometimes considered to be part of Australasia or Melanesia, but due to its being surrounded by Indonesia, and its once being politically part of Indonesia, it is generally considered to be in Southeast Asia. Papua New Guinea is occasionally thought of as a Southeast Asian country, but it is generally considered to be part of Australasia or Melanesia. The division between East Asia and Oceania is usually placed somewhere between the Japanese archipelago and the Northern Mariana Islands of Micronesia. Certain Japanese islands are often categorized as being within Micronesia due to non-continental geology and similar biogeography. The division between Asia and North America is considered to be the Bering Strait. Some of the Aleutian Islands, however, may be considered to be in Asia.

== Sovereign states ==
A sovereign state is a political organization with effective sovereignty over a population for whom it makes decisions in its interest. According to the Montevideo convention, a state must have a permanent population, a defined territory, a government, and the capacity to enter into relations with other states.

=== United Nations member states ===
There are 49 Asian states or states with substantial territory in Asia in this list. All are members of the United Nations.

Flag	Map	English short, formal names, and ISO	Domestic short and formal name(s)	Capital	Population 2021	Area
Flag of Afghanistan		Afghanistan Islamic Emirate of Afghanistan AFG	Dari: افغانستان – امارت اسلامی افغانستان (Afghānistān – Imārat-i Islāmī-yi Afghānistān) Pashto: فغانستان – د افغانستان اسلامي امارت (Afġānistān – Də Afġānistān Islāmī Imārat)	Kabul Dari and Pashto: کابل (Kābəl)	40,099,462	652,230 km^{2} (251,827 sq mi)
Flag of Armenia		Armenia Republic of Armenia ARM	Armenian: Հայաստան – Հայաստանի Հանրապետությու (Hayastan – Hayastani Hanrapetut'yun)	Yerevan Armenian: Երևան (Yerevan)	2,790,974	29,743 km^{2} (11,484 sq mi)
Flag of Azerbaijan		Azerbaijan Republic of Azerbaijan AZE	Azerbaijani: Azǝrbaycan – Azǝrbaycan Respublikası	Baku Azerbaijani: Bakı	10,312,992	86,600 km^{2} (33,436 sq mi)
Flag of Bahrain		Bahrain Kingdom of Bahrain BHR	Arabic: مملكة البحرين – البحرين (Al Baḥrayn – Mamlakat al Baḥrayn)	Manama Arabic: المنامة (Al Manāmah)	1,463,265	760 km^{2} (293 sq mi)
Flag of Bangladesh		Bangladesh People's Republic of Bangladesh BGD	Bengali: বাংলাদেশ – গণপ্রজাতন্ত্রী বাংলাদেশ (Bānglādesh – Gaṇaprajātantrī Bānglādesh)	Dhaka Bengali: ঢাকা (Ḍhākā)	169,356,251	147,570 km^{2} (56,977 sq mi)
Flag of Bhutan		Bhutan Kingdom of Bhutan BTN	Dzongkha: འབྲུག་ཡུལ་ – འབྲུག་རྒྱལ་ཁབ་ (Druk Yul – Druk Gyalkhapb)	Thimphu Dzongkha: ཐིམ་ཕུ (Thimphu)	777,486	38,394 km^{2} (14,824 sq mi)
Flag of Brunei		Brunei Brunei Darussalam BRN	Malay: Brunei – Negara Brunei Darussalam (بروني – نڬارا بروني دارالسلام)	Bandar Seri Begawan Malay: Bandar Seri Begawan (بندر سري بڬاوان)	460,356	5,765 km^{2} (2,226 sq mi)
Flag of Cambodia		Cambodia Kingdom of Cambodia KHM	Khmer: កម្ពុជា – ព្រះរាជាណាចក្រកម្ពុជា (Kâmpŭchéa – Preăhréachéanachâkr Kâmpŭchéa)	Phnom Penh Khmer: ភ្នំពេញ (Phnum Pénh)	16,589,023	181,035 km^{2} (69,898 sq mi)
Flag of China		China People's Republic of China CHN	Chinese: 中国 – 中华人民共和国 (Zhōngguó – Zhōnghuá Rénmín Gònghéguó)	Beijing Chinese: 北京 (Běijīng)	1,425,893,465	9,596,961 km^{2} (3,705,407 sq mi)
Flag of Cyprus		Cyprus Republic of Cyprus CYP	Greek: Κύπρος – Κυπριακή Δημοκρατία (Kýpros – Kypriakí Dimokratía) Turkish: Kıbrıs – Kıbrıs Cumhuriyeti	Nicosia Greek: Λευκωσία (Lefkosía) Turkish: Lefkoşa	1,244,188	9,251 km^{2} (3,572 sq mi)
		Egypt Arab Republic of Egypt EGY	Arabic: مصر – جمهورية مصر العربية (Miṣr—Jumhūrīyat Miṣr al-ʿArabiyya)	Cairo Arabic: القاهرة (al-Qāhirah)	109,262,178	1,001,449 km^{2} (386,662 sq mi)
Flag of Georgia		Georgia GEO	Georgian: საქართველო (Sak'art'velo)	Tbilisi / T'bilisi Georgian: თბილისი (T'bilisi)	3,757,980	69,700 km^{2} (26,911 sq mi)
Flag of India		India Republic of India IND	Hindi: भारत – भारत गणराज्य (Bhārat – Bhārat Gaṇarājya)	New Delhi Hindi: नई दिल्ली (Naī Dillī)	1,407,563,842	3,287,263 km^{2} (1,269,219 sq mi)
Flag of Indonesia		Indonesia Republic of Indonesia IDN	Indonesian: Indonesia – Republik Indonesia	Jakarta Indonesian: Jakarta – DKJ	273,753,191	1,904,569 km^{2} (735,358 sq mi)
Flag of Iran		Iran Islamic Republic of Iran IRN	Persian: جمهوری اسلامی ایران – ایران (Īrān – Jomhūrī-ye Eslāmī-ye Īrān)	Tehran Persian: تهران (Tehrān)	87,923,432	1,648,195 km^{2} (636,372 sq mi)
Flag of Iraq		Iraq Republic of Iraq IRQ	Arabic: العراق – جمهورية العراق (Al 'Irāq – Jumhūrīyat al 'Irāq)	Baghdad Arabic: بغداد (Baghdād)	43,533,592	438,317 km^{2} (169,235 sq mi)
Flag of Israel		Israel State of Israel ISR	Hebrew: יִשְרָאֵל – מְדִינַת יִשְׂרָאֵל (Yisra'el – Medinat Yisra'el) Arabic: إسرائيل – دَوْلَة إِسْرَائِيل (Isrā'īl – Dawlat Isrā'īl)	Jerusalem (Claimed and de facto) Hebrew: ירושלים (Yerushalayim) Arabic: القُدس (Al Quds)	8,900,059	20,770 km^{2} (8,019 sq mi)
Flag of Japan		Japan JPN	Japanese: 日本 – 日本国 (Nihon / Nippon – Nihon-koku / Nippon-koku)	Tokyo Japanese: 東京 (Tōkyō)	124,612,530	377,915 km^{2} (145,914 sq mi)
Flag of Jordan		Jordan Hashemite Kingdom of Jordan JOR	Arabic: اﻷرُدن – المملكة الأردنية الهاشميه (Al Urdun – Al Mamlakah al Urdunīyah al Hāshimīyah)	Amman Arabic: عمان (Ammān)	11,148,278	89,342 km^{2} (34,495 sq mi)
Flag of Kazakhstan		Kazakhstan Republic of Kazakhstan KAZ	Kazakh: Қазақстан – Қазақстан Республикасы (Qazaqstan – Qazaqstan Respýblıkasy) Russian: Казахстан – Республика Казахстан (Kazahstan – Respublika Kazahstan)	Astana Kazakh: Астана (Astana) Russian: Астана (Astana)	19,196,465	2,724,900 km^{2} (1,052,090 sq mi)
Flag of North Korea		North Korea Democratic People's Republic of Korea PRK	Korean: 조선 – 조선민주주의인민공화국 (Chosŏn – Chosŏn-minjujuŭi-inmin-konghwaguk)	Pyongyang Korean: 평양 (Phyŏngyang)	25,971,909	120,538 km^{2} (46,540 sq mi)
Flag of South Korea		South Korea Republic of Korea KOR	Korean: 한국 – 대한민국 (Hanguk – Daehan Minguk)	Seoul Korean: 서울 (Seoul)	51,830,139	99,720 km^{2} (38,502 sq mi)
Flag of Kuwait		Kuwait State of Kuwait KWT	Arabic: دولة الكويت – اﻟﻜﻮﻳت (Al Kuwayt – Dawlat al Kuwayt)	Kuwait City Arabic: الكويت (Al Kuwayt)	4,250,114	17,818 km^{2} (6,880 sq mi)
Flag of Kyrgyzstan		Kyrgyzstan Kyrgyz Republic KGZ	Kyrgyz: Кыргызстан – Кыргыз Республикасы (Kyrgyzstan – Kyrgyz Respublikasy) Russian: Кыргызстан – Кыргызская Республика (Kyrgyzstan – Kyrgyzskaja Respublika)	Bishkek Kyrgyz: Бишкек (Bishkek) Russian: Бишкек (Biškek)	6,527,743	199,951 km^{2} (77,202 sq mi)
Flag of Laos		Laos Lao People's Democratic Republic LAO	Lao: ປະເທດລາວ – ສາທາລະນະລັດ ປະຊາທິປະໄຕ ປະຊາຊົນລາວ (PathetLao – Sathalanalat Paxathipatai Paxaxôn Lao)	Vientiane Lao: ວຽງຈັນ (Viangchan)	7,425,057	236,800 km^{2} (91,429 sq mi)
Flag of Lebanon		Lebanon Lebanese Republic LBN	Arabic: لبنان – الجمهورية اللبنانية (Lubnān – Al Jumhūrīyah al Lubnānīyah)	Beirut Arabic: بيروت (Bayrūt)	5,592,631	10,452 km^{2} (4,036 sq mi)
Flag of Malaysia		Malaysia MYS	Malay: Malaysia	Kuala Lumpur Malay: Kuala Lumpur	33,573,874	329,847 km^{2} (127,355 sq mi)
Flag of Maldives		Maldives Republic of Maldives MDV	Dhivehi: ދިވެހިރާއްޖެ – ދިވެހިރާއްޖޭގެ ޖުމްހޫރިއްޔާ (Dhivehi Raajje – Dhivehi Raajjeyge Jumhooriyyaa)	Malé / Male' Dhivehi: މާލެ (Maale)	521,457	298 km^{2} (115 sq mi)
Flag of Mongolia		Mongolia MNG	Mongolian: Монгол – Монгол улс (Mongol – Mongol uls)	Ulaanbaatar Mongolian: Улаанбаатар (Ulaanbaatar)	3,347,782	1,564,116 km^{2} (603,909 sq mi)
Flag of Myanmar		Myanmar Republic of the Union of Myanmar MMR	Burmese: မြန်မာ – ပြည်ထောင်စု သမ္မတ မြန်မာနိုင်ငံတော်‌ (Myanma – Pyidaungzu Myanma Naingngandaw)	Nay Pyi Taw Burmese: နေပြည်တော် (Nay Pyi Taw)	53,798,084	676,578 km^{2} (261,228 sq mi)
Flag of Nepal		Nepal Federal Democratic Republic of Nepal NPL	Nepali: सङ्घीय लोकतान्त्रिक गणतन्त्र नेपाल (Nepāl – Saṅghīya Loktāntrik Gaṇatantra Nepāl)	Kathmandu Nepali: काठमाडौं (Kāṭhmāḍaũ)	30,034,989	147,516 km^{2} (56,956 sq mi)
Flag of Oman		Oman Sultanate of Oman OMN	Arabic: عُمان – سلطنة عُمان ('Umān – Salṭanat 'Umān)	Muscat Arabic: مسقط (Masqaţ)	4,520,471	309,500 km^{2} (119,499 sq mi)
Flag of Pakistan		Pakistan Islamic Republic of Pakistan PAK	Urdu: پَاکِسْتَان – اسلامی جمہوریہ پاکستان (Pākistān —Islāmī Jamhuriyah-e-Pākistān)	Islamabad Urdu: اسلام آباد (Islāmābād)	231,402,117	881,913 km^{2} (340,509 sq mi)
Flag of the Philippines		Philippines Republic of the Philippines PHL	Filipino: Pilipinas – Republika ng Pilipinas	Manila Filipino: Maynila	113,880,328	343,448 km^{2} (132,606 sq mi)
Flag of Qatar		Qatar State of Qatar QAT	Arabic: قطر – دولة قطر (Qatar – Dawlat Qatar)	Doha Arabic: الدوحة (Ad Dawḩah)	2,688,235	11,586 km^{2} (4,473 sq mi)
Flag of Russia		Russia Russian Federation RUS	Russian: Росси́я – Российская Федерация (Rossija – Rossijskaja Federacija)	Moscow Russian: Москва (Moskva)	145,102,755 (including Crimea)	17,098,242 km^{2} (6,601,668 sq mi)
Flag of Saudi Arabia		Saudi Arabia Kingdom of Saudi Arabia SAU	Arabic: السعودية – المملكة العربية السعودية (As Su'ūdīya – Al Mamlakah al 'Arabīyah as Su'ūdīyah)	Riyadh Arabic: الرياض (Ar Riyāḑ)	35,950,396	2,149,690 km^{2} (830,000 sq mi)
Flag of Singapore		Singapore Republic of Singapore SGP	Chinese: 新加坡 – 新加坡共和国 (Xīnjiāpō – Xīnjiāpō Gònghéguó) Malay: Singapura – Republik Singapura Tamil: சிங்கப்பூர் – சிங்கப்பூர் குடியரசு (Chiṅkappūr – Chiṅkappūr Kuṭiyarachu)	Singapore Chinese: 新加坡 (Xīnjiāpō) Malay: Singapura Tamil: சிங்கப்பூர் (Chiṅkappūr)	5,941,060	697 km^{2} (269 sq mi)
Flag of Sri Lanka		Sri Lanka Democratic Socialist Republic of Sri Lanka LKA	Sinhala: ශ්‍රී ලංකාව – ශ්‍රී ලංකා ප්‍රජාතාන්ත්‍රික සමාජවාදී ජනරජය (Shrī Laṁkā – Shrī Laṁkā Prajātāntrika Samājavādī Janarajaya) Tamil: இலங்கை – இலங்கை ஜனநாயக சமத்துவ குடியரசு (Ilaṅkai – Ilaṅkai Jaṉanāyaka Choṣhalichak Kuṭiyarachu)	Sri Jayawardenepura Kotte Sinhala: ශ්‍රී ජයවර්ධනපුර කෝට්ටේ (Shrī Jayavardhanapura Koṭṭe) Tamil: ஶ்ரீ ஜெயவர்த்தனபுர கோட்டை (Shrī Jĕyavarttaṉapura Koṭṭai)	21,773,441	65,610 km^{2} (25,332 sq mi)
Flag of Syria		Syria Syrian Arab Republic SYR	Arabic: سورية / سوريا – الجمهورية العربية السورية (Sūrīyah / Sūriyā – Al Jumhūrīyah al 'Arabīyah as Sūrīyah)	Damascus Arabic: دمشق (Dimashq)	21,324,367	185,180 km^{2} (71,498 sq mi)
Flag of Tajikistan		Tajikistan Republic of Tajikistan TJK	Tajik: Тоҷикистон – Ҷумҳурии Тоҷикистон (Tojikiston – Jumhurii Tojikiston) Russian: Таджикистан – Таджикистан Республика (Tajikistan – Tažikistan Respublika)	Dushanbe Tajik: Душанбе (Dushanbe)	9,750,064	143,100 km^{2} (55,251 sq mi)
Flag of Thailand		Thailand Kingdom of Thailand THA	Thai: ไทย – ราชอาณาจักรไทย (Thai – Ratcha Anachak Thai)	Bangkok Thai: กรุงเทพมหานคร (Krung Thep Maha Nakhon)	71,601,103	513,120 km^{2} (198,117 sq mi)
Flag of Timor-Leste		Timor-Leste Democratic Republic of Timor-Leste TLS	Portuguese: Timor-Leste – República Democrática de Timor-Leste Tetum: Timor Lorosa'e – Repúblika Demokrátika Timor Lorosa'e	Dili Portuguese: Díli Tetum: Díli	1,320,942	14,874 km^{2} (5,743 sq mi)
Flag of Turkey		Turkey Republic of Türkiye TUR	Turkish: Türkiye – Türkiye Cumhuriyeti	Ankara Turkish: Ankara	84,775,404	783,562 km^{2} (302,535 sq mi)
Flag of Turkmenistan		Turkmenistan TKM	Turkmen: Türkmenistan	Ashgabat Turkmen: Aşgabat	6,341,855	488,100 km^{2} (188,456 sq mi)
Flag of the United Arab Emirates		United Arab Emirates ARE	Arabic: اﻹﻣﺎرات – دولة الإمارات العربية المتحدة (Al Imārāt – Al Imārāt al 'Arabīyah al Muttaḥidah)	Abu Dhabi Arabic: أبوظبي (Abu Dhabi)	9,365,145	83,600 km^{2} (32,278 sq mi)
Flag of Uzbekistan		Uzbekistan Republic of Uzbekistan UZB	Uzbek: O'zbekiston – O'zbekiston Respublikasi	Tashkent Uzbek: Toshkent	34,081,449	447,400 km^{2} (172,742 sq mi)
Flag of Vietnam		Vietnam / Viet Nam Socialist Republic of Vietnam VNM	Vietnamese: Việt Nam – Cộng hòa Xã hội chủ nghĩa Việt Nam	Hanoi Vietnamese: Hà Nội	97,468,029	332,698 km^{2} (128,455 sq mi)
Flag of Yemen		Yemen Republic of Yemen YEM	Arabic: اليمن – الجمهورية اليمنية (Al Yaman – Al Jumhūrīyah al Yamanīyah)	Sana'a Arabic: صنعاء (Ṣan'ā')	32,981,641	527,968 km^{2} (203,850 sq mi)

=== States with limited, but substantial, international recognition ===
In this list, Palestine is a state with substantial international recognition and UN General Assembly non-member observer state status but without practical control over tangible territory, while Taiwan is a de facto state with full practical sovereignty over its territory and unofficial ties with most of the international community but not widely recognized de jure. Although a founding member of the United Nations as the Republic of China, since 1971 Taiwan is no longer recognized by the United Nations.

Flag	Map	English short, formal names, and ISO	Status	Domestic short and formal names	Capital	Population 2021	Area
Flag of Palestine		Palestine State of Palestine PSE	Recognized by 157 UN member states. See International recognition of the State of Palestine. One of two United Nations General Assembly non-member observer states	Arabic: فلسطين – دولة فلسطين (Filasṭīn – Dawlat Filasṭīn)	Ramallah (de facto); Arabic: رام الله (Rāmāllah) Jerusalem (declared); Arabic: القدس (Al-Quds)	5,133,392	6,220 km^{2} (2,402 sq mi)
Flag of Taiwan		Taiwan Republic of China TWN	Claimed as part of the People's Republic of China. Officially recognized as sovereign by 11 UN member states and the Holy See, which deem it to be the rightful government of all of China. In addition, Taiwan maintains unofficial relations with most other countries and is de facto recognized by most sovereign states. See Political status of Taiwan for more information about the situation.	Traditional Chinese: 臺灣/台灣 – 中華民國 (Táiwān—Zhōnghuá Mínguó)	Taipei Traditional Chinese: 台北 (Táiběi)	23,859,912	35,980 km^{2} (13,892 sq mi)

=== De facto states with little or no international recognition ===
The three de facto states on this list have little or no international recognition and are not members of the United Nations. All are defined as states by the declarative theory.

Flag	Map	English short and formal names	Status	Domestic short and formal names	Capital	Population (2011)	Area
Flag of Abkhazia		Abkhazia Republic of Abkhazia	Claimed as an autonomous republic of Georgia. Recognised by 5 UN states.	Abkhaz: Аҧсуа (Apswa)	Sukhumi / Sokhumi Abkhaz: Аҟəа (Akwa)	250,000	8,660 km^{2} (3,344 sq mi)
Flag of Northern Cyprus		Northern Cyprus Turkish Republic of Northern Cyprus	Claimed as part of the Republic of Cyprus. Recognised only by Turkey.	Turkish: Kuzey Kıbrıs – Kuzey Kıbrıs Türk Cumhuriyeti	North Nicosia Turkish: Lefkoşa	285,356	3,355 km^{2} (1,295 sq mi)
Flag of South Ossetia		South Ossetia Republic of South Ossetia - State of Alania	Claimed as part of Georgia. Recognised by 5 UN states.	Iron Ossetic: Хуссар Ирыстон – Республикӕ Хуссар Ирыстон (Khussar Iryston – Respublikæ Khussar Iryston) Russian: Южная Осетия – Республика Южная Осетия (Yuzhnaya Osetiya – Respublika Yuzhnaya Osetiya)	Tskhinvali Iron Ossetic: Цхинвал or Чъреба (Chreba)	70,000	3,900 km^{2} (1,506 sq mi)

== Dependencies and other territories ==
The four territories in this list are controlled by a state of which they are not considered to be a part.

Flag	Map	English short, formal names, and ISO	Status	Domestic short and formal names	Capital	Population	Area
Flag of the United Kingdom, as used in Akrotiri and Dhekelia		Akrotiri and Dhekelia Sovereign Base Areas of Akrotiri and Dhekelia	British overseas territory	English: Akrotiri and Dhekelia – Sovereign Base Areas of Akrotiri and Dhekelia Greek: Ακρωτήρι και Δεκέλεια – Περιοχές Κυρίαρχων Βάσεων Ακρωτηρίου και Δεκέλειας (Akrotíri ke Dekélia – Periochés Kyríarchon Váseon Akrotiríou ke Dekélias)	Episkopi Cantonment Greek: Φρουρά Επισκοπής (Frourá Episkopís)	15,700	254 km^{2} (98 sq mi)
Flag of the United Kingdom, as used in the British Indian Ocean Territory		British Indian Ocean Territory IOT	British overseas territory	English: British Indian Ocean Territory	Camp Justice	4,000	54,400 km^{2} (21,004 sq mi)
Flag of Christmas Island		Christmas Island Territory of Christmas Island CXR	Territory of Australia	English: Christmas Island – Territory of Christmas Island	Flying Fish Cove / The Settlement	1,843	135 km^{2} (52 sq mi)
		Cocos (Keeling) Islands Territory of the Cocos (Keeling) Islands CCK	Territory of Australia	English: Cocos (Keeling) Islands – Territory of the Cocos (Keeling) Islands Cocos Islands Malay: Pulu Kokos (Keeling)	West Island / Bantam	544	14 km^{2} (5 sq mi)

== Special areas of internal sovereignty ==
The following two entities are integral areas of their controlling state, but have a political arrangement that was decided through an international agreement.

Flag	Map	English short, formal names, and ISO	Status	Domestic short and formal names	Capital	Population	Area
Flag of Hong Kong		Hong Kong Hong Kong Special Administrative Region of the People's Republic of China HKG	Special Administrative Region of the People's Republic of China	Traditional Chinese: 香港 – 中華人民共和國香港特別行政區	Hong Kong	7,582,000	2,755 km^{2} (1,064 sq mi)
Flag of Macau		Macau / Macao Macao Special Administrative Region of the People's Republic of China MAC	Special Administrative Region of the People's Republic of China	Traditional Chinese: 澳門 – 中華人民共和國澳門特別行政區 Portuguese: Macau – Região Administrativa Especial de Macau da República Popular da China	Macau / Macao	693,000	28.2 km^{2} (10.9 sq mi)

== See also ==
- List of Asian countries by GDP
- List of predecessors of sovereign states in Asia
- List of states with limited recognition
