= Macclesfield (1699 ship) =

English East Indiaman 1799–1802

History

England
- Name: Macclesfield
- Namesake: Macclesfield, or the Earl of Macclesfield
- In service: 1699
- Out of service: 1708

General characteristics
- Tons burthen: 250, or 312 (bm)
- Length: 73 ft 5 in (22.4 m) (Note: Converted from 62.5 cubits, giving an implied 14.024 inches per cubit.)
- Beam: 23 ft 4 in (7.1 m) (Note: Converted from 23 cubits using 14.024 inches per cubit.)
- Complement: 46

Macclesfield was a galley or "frigate" that the British East India Company (EIC) hired in 1699. She made two voyages for the EIC, the first to China (Canton), and the second to Bombay.

1st EIC voyage (1699–1701): Captain John Hurle sailed from the Downs on 2 March 1699, bound for China. Macclesfield was at Madeira on 14 March, reached Batavia on 15 July, and arrived at Macao on 26 August. She was at Whampoa Anchorage on 15 September, back at Macao on 29 September, and again at Whampoa on 7 October. She left Whampoa on 18 July 1700, and arrived at Chusan on 6 August. She left Chusan on 24 December and arrived at Portsmouth on 1 July 1701.

In March 1801, on her voyage from China back to Portsmouth, Macclesfield may have passed through the Gaspar Strait. She apparently passed by the Macclesfield Bank. (Note: Horsburgh puts Macclesfield in the Gaspar Strait in March 1802, but sighting the Macclesfield Bank in 1801 and giving its coordinates. Horsburgh refers to Macclesfield as the "Fort St David country ship". It is possible that before, or more probably after her service with the EIC that she moved to Fort St David.)

2nd EIC voyage (1701-1703): Captain Thomas Roberts or Captain Hurle sailed from the Downs on 10 September 1701, bound for Bombay. Macclesfield was at Madeira on 29 October and Sâo Tiago on 20 October. From there she stopped at Annabon (probably Annobón, and St Helena. She arrived at Bombay on 29 March 1702. from there she visited Surat, Muscat, and Mokha, before reaching the Cape of Good Hope in December. She then sailed to the Downs.

It is not clear what happened to Macclesfield after her two voyages for the EIC. There are references that suggest that she may have become a country ship sailing out of India.
