= Northeast Asia =

Subregion of Asia

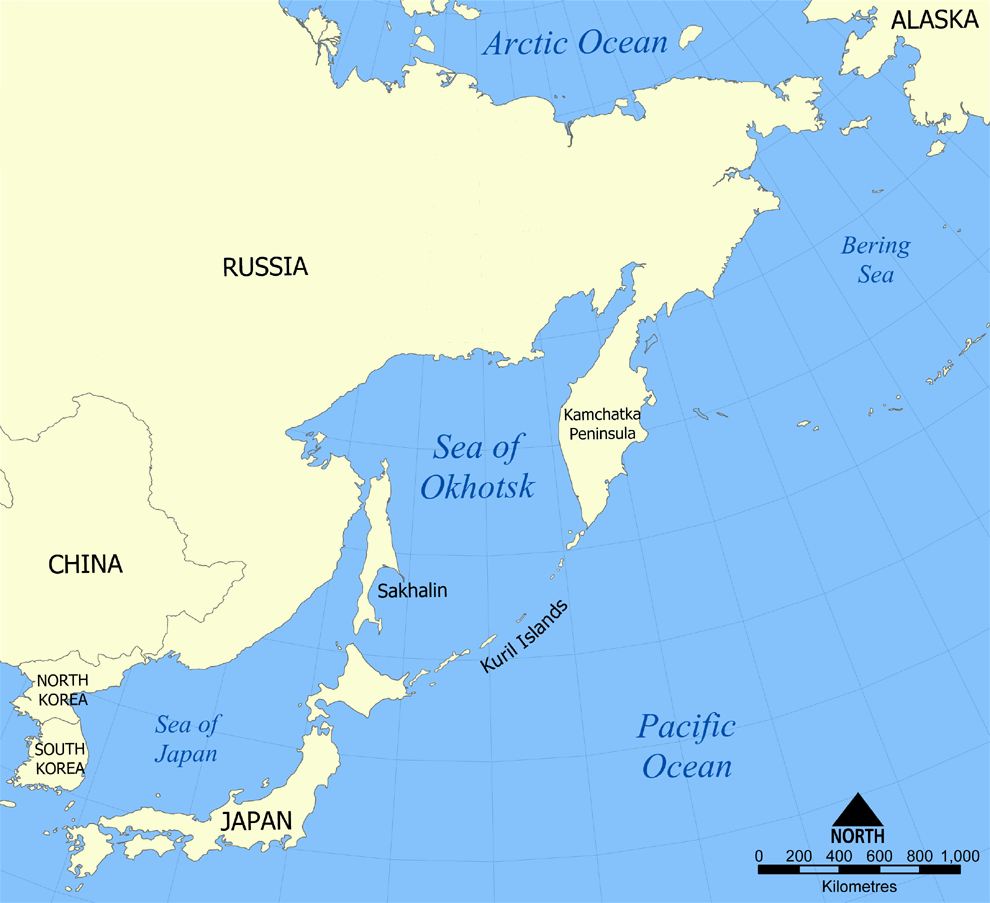
- Area: 9,600,000 km^{2} (3,700,000 sq mi)
- Population: 341.55 million (2024)
- Population density: 35.5/km² (92.3/sq mi)
- GDP (PPP): $13.17 trillion (2026)
- GDP (nominal): $7.42 trillion (2026)
- Demonym: Northeast Asian
- Countries: China (Northeast China); Japan (Japanese archipelago, excluding the Ryukyu Islands); North Korea; South Korea (Korean peninsula); Mongolia (Mongolian Plateau); Russia (Russian Far East)
- Languages: Japonic, Koreanic, Tungusic, Sino-Tibetan, Mongolic, Slavic

Northeast Asia, sometimes called Northeastern Asia or Northeast Eurasia, is a geographical subregion of Asia. Its northeastern landmass and islands are bounded by the North Pacific Ocean.

The term Northeast Asia was popularized during the 1930s by American historian and political scientist Robert Kerner. Under Kerner's definition, "Northeast Asia" includes the Japanese archipelago, the Korean peninsula, the Mongolian Plateau, the Northeast China Plain, and the mountainous regions of the Russian Far East, stretching from the Lena River in the west to the Pacific Ocean in the east.

== Definitions ==
The definition of Northeast Asia is not static but often changes according to the context in which it is discussed.

The nations of Northeast Asia is composed of China (Northeast region), Japan, Korea, and usually include Mongolia and Siberia. Parts or the whole of Northern China are also frequently included in sources. The Economic Research Institute for Northeast Asia defines the region as the aforementioned countries, including Russia.

Prominent cities in this area include Busan, Changchun, Dalian, Harbin, Hiroshima, Incheon, Khabarovsk, Kitakyushu, Kobe, Kyoto, Nagasaki, Nagoya, Osaka, Pyongyang, Sapporo, Seoul, Shenyang, Tokyo, Ulaanbaatar, Vladivostok, and Yokohama.

== Demographics ==
The peoples of Northeast Asia include the Japanese, the Koreans, the Manchus, the Northern/Northeastern Han Chinese, the Mongols, and the Slavs. Through these groups, the region includes language families such as Japonic, Koreanic, Tungusic, Sino-Tibetan, Mongolic, and Slavic.

The total population count is around 341.55 million in 2024 with a population density of 35.5/km² (92.3/sq mi).

== Economy ==
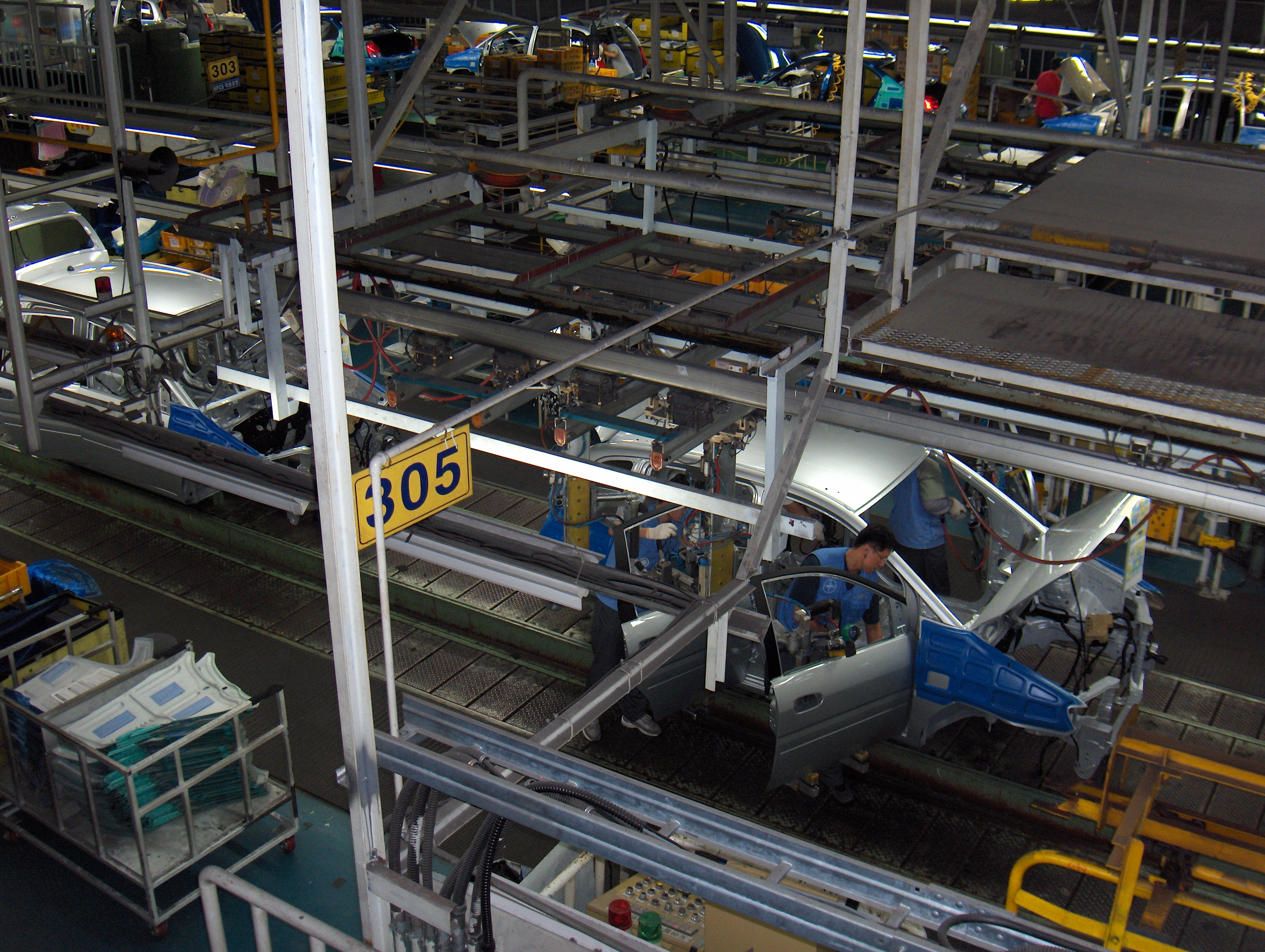
The world's largest automobile manufacturing plant in South Korea

Northeast Asia is one of the most important economic regions of the world, accounting for 25.3% of the world's nominal GDP in 2019, which is slightly larger than the United States. It is also one of the major political centers and has significant influence on international relations.

By the end of the 1990s, Northeast Asia had a share of 12% of the global energy consumption, with a strong increasing trend.

By 2030, the major economic growth in the region is expected to double or triple this share.

== Biogeography ==
In biogeography, Northeast Asia generally refers roughly to the area spanning the Japanese archipelago, the Korean peninsula, Northeast China, The Mongolian Plateau and the Russian Far East between Lake Baikal in southern Siberia and the Pacific Ocean.

Northeast Asia is mainly covered by temperate forest, taiga, and the Eurasian Steppe, while tundra is found in the region's far north. Summer and winter temperatures are highly contrasted. It is also a mountainous area.

== See also ==
- Arctic shipping routes
- Far East
  - East Asian studies
  - East Asia
  - North Asia
  - Pacific Asia
- Mongolian Plateau
  - Inner Mongolia
- Japanese archipelago
  - Sea of Japan
- Korean peninsula
  - Korea Strait
- Northeast China
  - Manchuria
  - Amur River
- Siberia
  - Russian Far East
  - Sea of Okhotsk
  - Lake Baikal
  - Kamchatka peninsula
  - Bering Strait
  - Russian studies
