= Rural Alliances =

Rural Alliances is an international project funded by the European Union through the Interreg North West Europe European Regional Development Fund IVB funding scheme aimed at bringing rural businesses together with their communities to stimulate local economies and services.

Twelve partner organisations from six different EU countries are working together. The twelve are:

Belgium

- Boerenbondvereniging voor Projecten vzw
- Vlaamse Landmaatschappij (VLM) (Flemish Land Agency)

France

- Maison de l'Emploi, du Développement, de la Formation et de l'Insertion du Pays de Redon-Bretagne Sud (MEDEFI)
- Laval, Mayenne Technopole (Laval & Mayenne Technology Park)

Germany

- Philipps Universität, Marburg

Republic of Ireland

- South Kerry Development Partnership Ltd.
- Mayo County Council

Netherlands

- Stichting Streekhuis Het Groene Woud & De Meierij
- Stichting Streekhuis Kempenland
- Gemeente Lochem

United Kingdom

- Brecon Beacons National Park Authority
- University of Wales, Trinity Saint David

The project was initiated in 2011 with a meeting in Brecon, Wales. A project officer is employed by the Brecon Beacons National Park Authority to develop clusters of activity in several areas of the park.

Alliance building Blueprint Prototype

The University Partners have been working closely with the partners to explore and develop concepts and frameworks to capture, record and share successful alliance building methods in order to develop an Alliance Building Blueprint. To begin this process, they held a master class with all the partners in February 2012 in Leuven, Belgium, where key concepts were discussed and agreed, including debates on what constitutes a rural area, what is a community, and how many members are needed to make up an Alliance. This was followed up with research, interviews and further workshops with the partners to explore alliance building methods in the different areas.

At this early stage in the project an outline concept has been developed. This shows a cyclic phase from building the alliance, its management, reviewing its development and growth, and looking towards long-term planning.

Key components include a contact database; a method of plotting the skills and capacity that exist in the alliance or in the wider community; creating an atmosphere of open dialogue; identifying and supporting champions who are visionary and “get things done”, and an understanding of local context, what other initiatives are competing, what are the risks and what are the rewards.

This concept will now be developed and modified through case studies on the different alliances in 2013/4 to explore the methods used to make them successful. Research will be done to assess how useful tools and techniques can be transferred between alliances, to ensure that lessons are being learned and communicated across the partnership, and monitoring and evaluation will take place to ensure the viability, usefulness and relevance of the Blueprint model.

Rural Vibrancy Measuring Index (RVMI)

The Rural Vibrancy Measuring Index is a tool that is currently being developed by the university partners of the Rural Alliances project. The current stage of the RVMI represents the outcomes of several transnational workshops, the evaluation of partner questionnaires and further literature research. The purpose of this index is to give local communities a tool to determine their vibrancy. Using the RVMI should allow local communities to acquire knowledge on the strengths and weaknesses of their community and help them to allocate their resources more efficiently and develop their community.

Definition ‘Rural Vibrancy'

‘Rural Vibrancy’ describes the nature of a rural community, which is characterized by active involvement and the creative, dynamic interaction of people from different groupings with the capacity to create common objectives and to act jointly to develop their community. It is desirable from the perspective of the Rural Alliances consortium that vibrant rural communities follow the aim to develop and/or maintain social, cultural and economic benefit, adapt to change and improve quality of life for everyone within the community.

RVMI categories

The analytical subject of the RVMI is an analysis of local community groups that are formed within a specific area. The RVMI focusses on local community groups because they are the origin and the basis of ‘vibrancy’, being the organisational form of people that act jointly. Depending on the actions the community groups take (e.g. cooperation) they can make a place more or less vibrant. On the basis of this pattern the RVMI proposes a ‘catalogue’ of quantitative and qualitative questions on the role of community groups that can be visualized and interpreted. The first field tests are scheduled for early 2013.

Contribution to rural development

The main goal of the Rural Alliances project is to develop a transnational tool to capture rural vibrancy. Approaches like quality of life or vibrant communities refer to a presence of certain amenities and measure hard and soft location factors. A vibrant countryside is one of the main categories of the English Rural White Paper and relates to community involvement and activity. It distinguishes between vibrant, active, barely active, and sleeping parishes assessed on numbers of meeting places, voluntary and cultural activities, as well as contested parish elections. Together with a living, working and protected countryside the vibrant countryside is seen as part of a sustainable rural development. Community involvement, participation and inhabitants’ perceptions need to be integrated in such instruments. Therefore, vibrant rural communities follow the aim to develop and/or maintain social, cultural and economic benefit, adapt to change and improve quality of life for everyone within the community. This development is on-going, iterative and inclusive. Taking various national frames, cultural backgrounds, social behaviours and personal opinions into consideration lead to a broadly agreed definition, approach and implementation process. A rural development instrument is created by the transnational partnership. This is called Rural Vibes.
