= At Brand project =

AT.Brand is a European project co-financed by the European Regional Development Fund (ERDF), Interreg Atlantic Area IVB supporting transnational cooperation projects in Atlantica regions. Between 1 January 2014 and September 2015, the project focused on innovation and management in integrated city branding.

== Interreg Atlantic Area IVB programme ==
Interreg Atlantic Area IVB is the fourth transnational cooperation programme in the area and aims to contribute to the territorial cohesion of the Atlantic Area. Regional cooperation is carried out by common strategy actions and the exchange of know-how.

The programme consists of 27 cooperation areas in the United Kingdom, Ireland, France, Spain, and Portugal. These countries are typically considered as sharing a strong cultural identity, history and heritage, as well as a similar geographic and maritime environment.

== Purpose of the project ==
=== Partners ===
The project is led by Dublin City Council. The remaining six partners are:

- Câmara Municipal de Faro
- Cardiff City Council
- Communauté d'agglomération de La Rochelle
- Conférence des Villes de l’Arc Atlantique
- Fomento San Sebastian
- Liverpool Vision.

Other cities and institutions are also invited to share the project.

=== Integrated city branding strategy ===
City branding is understood by partners as a complete and human communication strategy. AT.Brand views cities as unique by their history and experience rather than products, so the use of traditional logos and slogans is not promoted. Instead, cities communicate their brand narrative globally and with local stakeholders to reach a sustainable strategy.

=== Objectives ===
In accordance with the Interreg Atlantic Area IVB priority that supports transnational projects working together for sustainable urban and regional development, AT.Brand aims to make cities and regions more influential and attractive through city networking, best practices in place branding and past initiatives, as well the views from the general public.

The actions to reach these objectives include:

- a cross-learning programme of progressive city-brand management
- innovative pilot actions at local level with high potential for transferability
- a web-based toolkit for the Atlantic brand, highlighting core brand messaging
- creating a draft roadmap for co-branding the Atlantic area.

== Activities ==
=== Workshops ===
Workshops are international meetings where cities come together to define their communication strategy. The first was held in Dublin to launch the project in February 2014. The second was in Liverpool in June 2014. The third was held in La Rochelle in December 2014 to discuss city brand governance. The fourth was held in San Sebastian in April 2015 to discuss the actions of communication in city branding and marketing. The final workshop was planned to take place in Dublin in September 2015.

=== Pilot projects ===
Each participating city has its own pilot project:

- Dublin is working on a digital platform.
- La Rochelle and Faro are working on their Territorial Marketing Strategies.
- San Sebastian aims to position itself as a City of Innovation.
- Cardiff looks to improve its recognition and popularity outside the city by people living in the city.
- Liverpool's pilot project is called It's Liverpool.
