= Interreg North Sea Programme =

The Interreg North Sea Programme 2021–2027 (Interreg VIB) supports cooperation projects connecting regions in seven countries around the North Sea.

The programme is part of Interreg, one of the European Union's main funding instruments supporting its Cohesion Policy.

== Cooperation area ==
The programme covers all of Denmark and the Netherlands, the southern part of Norway, the Flemish Region of Belgium, northwestern regions of Germany, southwestern parts of Sweden and northwestern regions of France.

The Joint Secretariat managing the programme on a daily basis is located in Viborg, Denmark.

== Goals of the programme ==
The programme’s four funding priorities reflect key challenges facing the North Sea Region. Interreg North Sea funding aims to contribute towards:

1. Building smart and robust economies.
2. Fast-tracking green transitions.
3. Fostering climate resilience, a clean environment, and a rich biodiversity.
4. Improving cooperation governance.

== Previous programme periods ==
=== Interreg North Sea Region Programme 2014–2020 (Interreg VB) ===
The North Sea Region Programme 2014–2020 supported 73 cooperation projects in four priorities:

1. Thinking growth
2. Eco-innovation
3. Sustainable NSR
4. Green transport and mobility.

=== Interreg North Sea Region Programme 2007–2013 (Interreg IVB) ===
The North Sea Region Programme 2007–2013 supported 78 cooperation projects in the following priorities:

1. Building on our capacity for innovation
2. Promoting the sustainable management of our environment
3. Improving the accessibility of places in the North Sea Region
4. Promoting sustainable and competitive communities.

=== Interreg North Sea Programme 2000–2006 (Interreg IIIB) ===
The North Sea Programme 2000–2006 supported 70 transnational co-operation projects.

=== Interreg North Sea Programme 1997–1999 (Interreg IIC) ===
The North Sea Programme 1997–1999 was the precursor of the transnational North Sea Programme that has been part of the Interreg B (transnational) strand from the year 2000 onwards.

== See also ==
- European Commission (EC)
- European Regional Development Fund (ERDF)
- European Union (EU)
- Interreg
- North Sea
- North Sea Commission (NSC)
- North Sea Region (NSR)
- Transnationality
