= North Sea Commission =

Intergovernmental organization in North Europe

The North Sea Commission (NSC) is an international organization founded in 1989. It facilitates partnerships between regions connected with the North Sea and promotes the North Sea Region as an economic entity within Europe. It is part of the Conference of Peripheral Maritime Regions, a pan-European organization for subnational governments.

The presidency of the North Sea Commission is made up of one president and two vice presidents who are elected every two years. The work is organized in four thematic groups, based on the four priorities of the organization's strategy North Sea Region 2020: Managing Maritime Space, Increased accessibility and sustainable transport, Tackling climate change, and Attractive and sustainable communities.

(Acting) President: Andreas Lervik, Østfold (Norway)

Vice President: Elisabet Babic, Halland (Sweden)

Vice President: vacant

== Members ==
=== Denmark ===
- North Denmark
- Central Denmark
- South Denmark

=== Belgium ===
- West Flanders

=== Germany ===
- Bremen
- Lower Saxony
- Schleswig-Holstein

=== Netherlands ===
- Samenwerkingsverband Noord-Nederland
  - Drenthe
  - Friesland
  - Groningen
- Flevoland
- North Holland
- South Holland
- Zeeland

=== Norway ===
- Aust-Agder
- Buskerud
- Hordaland
- Møre og Romsdal
- Rogaland
- Sogn og Fjordane
- Sør-Trøndelag
- Telemark
- Vest-Agder
- Vestfold
- Østfold

=== Sweden ===
- Halland
- Västra Götaland
- Örebro

=== France ===
- Hauts-de-France

=== United Kingdom ===
==== England ====
- Southend-on-Sea

==== Scotland ====
- Aberdeenshire
- Fife

== See also ==
- North Sea
- North Sea Region (NSR)
- Interreg North Sea Programme
