= Walker Shoal =

Shoal in the South China Sea

Walker Shoal 漫步暗沙
Disputed island
- Other names: Manbu Ansha

Geography
- Location: Macclesfield Bank, South China Sea
- Coordinates: 15°55′N 114°29′E

Administration
- People's Republic of China
- Province: Hainan
- Prefecture-level city: Sansha
- County-level division: Zhongsha District

Claimed by
- Republic of China (Taiwan)
- Municipality: Kaohsiung

Demographics
- Population: 0

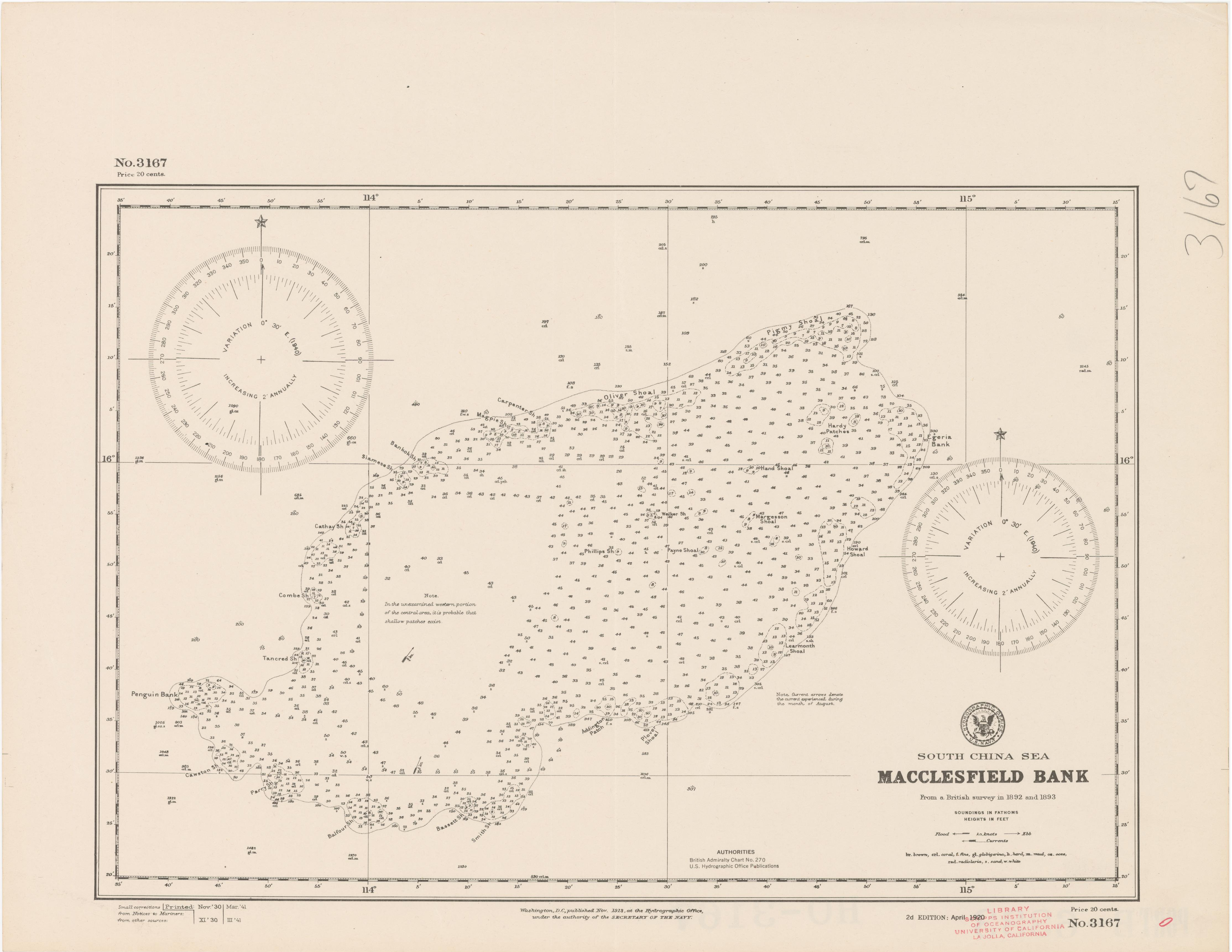
1920 nautical chart of Macclesfield Bank

Walker Shoal, also known as Manbu Ansha (Chinese: 漫步暗沙; pinyin: Mànbù Ànshā) is a shoal in the Macclesfield Bank in the South China Sea.

There are no islands, no land above sea-level, no settlements, and no inhabitants in the region. The least depth shown on the nautical chart is 5 fathoms (30 ft; 9.1 m). Although the area is claimed by the PRC and the ROC, no country has control of the region.

The PRC claim that it is administered as part of the Zhongsha Dao and Jiao Neighborhood Committee township-level division, in the county-level division of Zhongsha District of Sansha prefecture-level city, in Hainan province. However, it is not clear where the seat of this committee is.

An Xinhuanet.com story dated 27 June 2013 stated that "a maritime fishery resource breeding and research base" had been established in the area. The article goes on to say:

The base ... covers a sea area of 625 hectares ... Aquaculture researchers will put 20,000 grouper fry, 20,000 spats of pearl oysters, 20,000 spats of pteria penguin, a genus of winged oyster, and 20,000 pieces of red seaweeds eucheuma into the sea for research ... Researchers will carry out a field investigation and scientific research activities on the meteorological, hydrological and topographic conditions, maritime species, submarine grassland and coral reefs in the Manbu Ansha area over the next three days ...
