= List of Asian countries by GDP =

This is a sorted list of Asian countries according to their rank, with their factual and estimated gross domestic product data by the International Monetary Fund. The top 3 largest economies in Asia are China, India and Japan.

== List ==
=== GDP Nominal ===
China is the largest economy in Asia, comprising nearly half of the continent's gross domestic product.
1. China (46.4%)
2. Japan (9.75%)
3. India (9.25%)
4. South Korea (4.30%)
5. Turkey (3.65%)
6. Indonesia (3.43%)
7. Saudi Arabia (3.09%)
8. Taiwan (2.18%)
9. Other (17.9%)

Region rank	Country/Territory	2026 GDP (nominal) in billions
—	Asia	44.90 trillion
1	China	20.85 trillion
2	Japan	4.38 trillion
3	India	4.15 trillion
4	South Korea	1.93 trillion
5	Turkey	1.64 trillion
6	Indonesia	1.54 trillion
7	Saudi Arabia	1.39 trillion
8	Taiwan	976.72 billion
9	Israel	719.85 billion
10	Singapore	659.57 billion
11	United Arab Emirates	621.55 billion
12	Thailand	579.99 billion
13	Vietnam	527.27 billion
14	Malaysia	516.43 billion
15	Philippines	512.22 billion
16	Bangladesh	510.7 billion
17	Hong Kong (SAR)	450.14 billion
18	Pakistan	407.78 billion
19	Kazakhstan	360.46 billion
20	Iran	300.29 billion
21	Iraq	264.78 billion
22	Qatar	217.42 billion
23	Uzbekistan	181.5 billion
24	Kuwait	172.92 billion
25	Oman	117.18 billion
26	Sri Lanka	108.83 billion
27	Myanmar	83.83 billion
28	Turkmenistan	83.06 billion
29	Azerbaijan	78.37 billion
30	Jordan	64.91 billion
31	Macau (SAR)	54.23 billion
32	Cambodia	52.38 billion
33	Bahrain	48.85 billion
34	Nepal	45.84 billion
35	Cyprus	45.17 billion
36	Georgia	42.72 billion
37	Lebanon	34.49 billion
38	Armenia	31.87 billion
39	Mongolia	28.45 billion
40	Kyrgyzstan	23.61 billion
41	Tajikistan	20.42 billion
42	Syria	19.99 billion
43	Afghanistan	19.66 billion
44	Laos	18.96 billion
45	Palestine	17.17 billion
46	Brunei	16.86 billion
47	North Korea	16.45 billion
48	Maldives	8.13 billion
49	Bhutan	3.86 billion
50	Timor-Leste	2.17 billion

=== GDP PPP ===
Percent of share of Top 5 countries in Asia by GDP PPP
1. China (40.1%)
2. India (17.1%)
3. Japan (6.58%)
4. Indonesia (4.93%)
5. Turkey (3.64%)
6. Others (27.6%)

Rank	Country/Territory	2026 GDP (PPP)
—	Asia	110.44 trillion
1	China	44.29 trillion
2	India	18.90 trillion
3	Japan	7.26 trillion
4	Indonesia	5.45 trillion
5	Turkey	4.03 trillion
6	South Korea	3.54 trillion
7	Saudi Arabia	2.89 trillion
8	Taiwan	2.27 trillion
9	Vietnam	2.03 trillion
10	Thailand	1.96 trillion
11	Bangladesh	1.92 trillion
12	Pakistan	1.80 trillion
13	Iran	1.78 trillion
14	Malaysia	1.61 trillion
15	Philippines	1.57 trillion
16	Singapore	1.06 trillion
17	United Arab Emirates	1.01 trillion
18	Kazakhstan	993.6 billion
19	Iraq	670.5 billion
20	Hong Kong	635.6 billion
21	Israel	609.4 billion
22	Uzbekistan	552.2 billion
23	Qatar	358.4 billion
24	Sri Lanka	343.1 billion
25	Myanmar	293.3 billion
26	Kuwait	283.1 billion
27	Azerbaijan	281.3 billion
28	Oman	247.4 billion
29	Nepal	194.1 billion
30	Turkmenistan	164.4 billion
31	Cambodia	160.4 billion
32	Jordan	153.6 billion
33	Georgia	125.4 billion
34	Bahrain	115.9 billion
35	Syria	109.7 billion
36	Afghanistan	101.0 billion
37	Macau	99.61 billion
38	Laos	86.49 billion
39	Armenia	82.74 billion
40	Mongolia	80.39 billion
41	Kyrgyzstan	73.89 billion
42	Lebanon	70.19 billion
43	Tajikistan	69.67 billion
44	Cyprus	67.44 billion
45	Brunei	45.48 billion
46	Yemen	30.93 billion
47	Palestine	23.15 billion
48	Bhutan	15.95 billion
49	Maldives	15.80 billion
50	Timor-Leste	7.52 billion
