= Pacific Asia =

Asian region bordering the Pacific Ocean

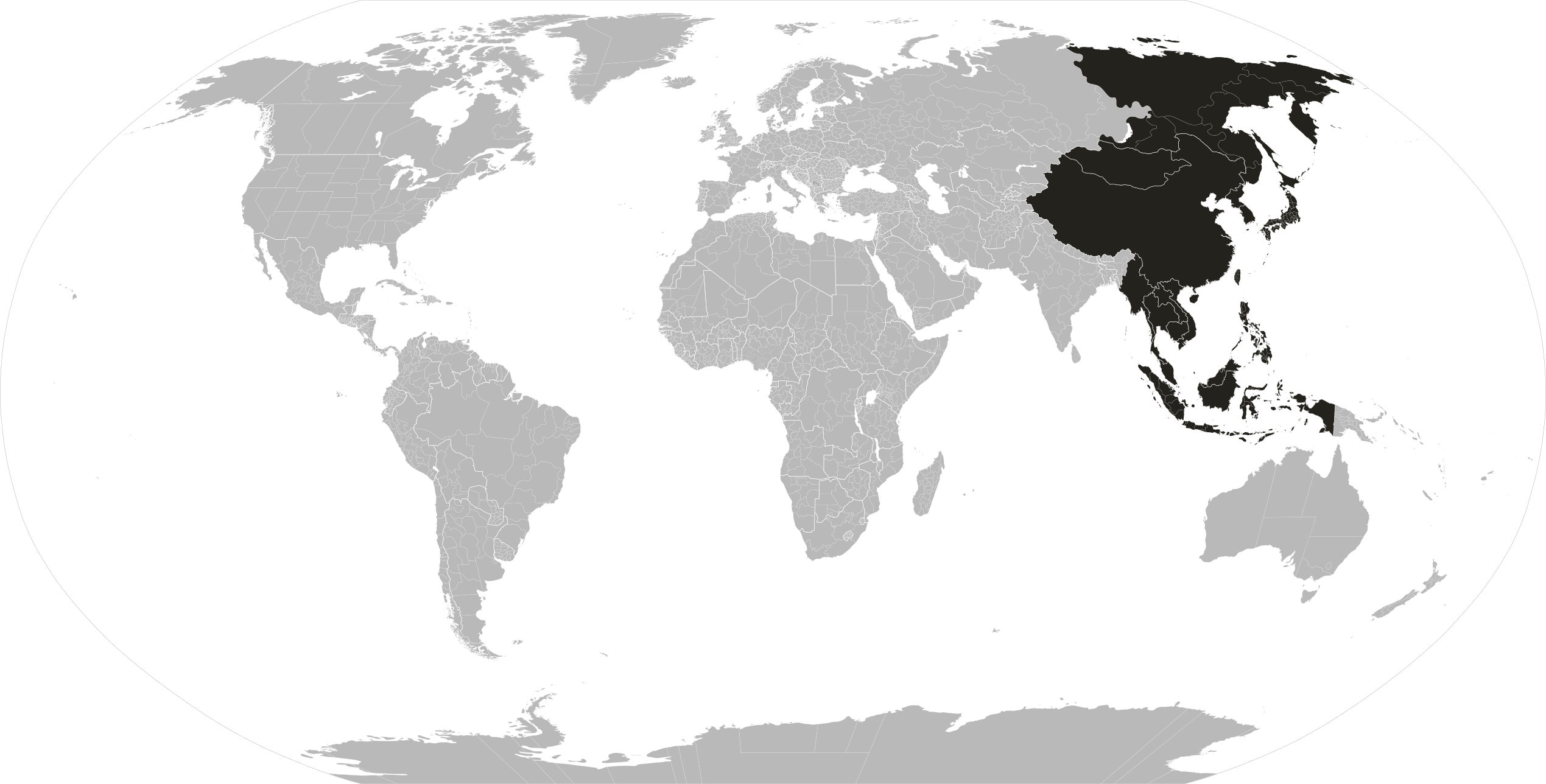
An image of the very similar Far East.

Pacific Asia is the region along the east coast of Asia bordering the western Pacific Ocean. It constitutes most of East Asia, Northeast Asia, and Southeast Asia.

The region is contested by China, America, and Japan, with India recently engaging as well as part of its Act East policy and overall rise on the world stage.

== History ==
World map in outline centred on Pacific Asia and Australia.

In ancient times, the central country in much of the region was China, with the Chinese diaspora creating economic integration throughout.

=== Modern era ===
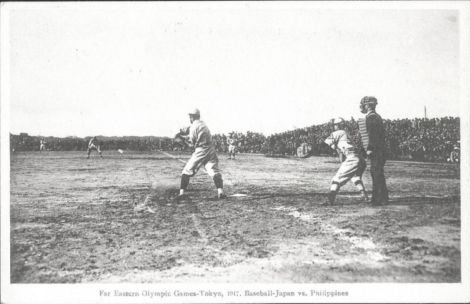
The Japan-Philippines baseball game from the 1917 Far Eastern Games. Baseball has served as a trans-Pacific pastime from the 19th century onward, having reached the western Pacific along with America's contemporary expansion.

Columbus's 1492 voyage to the Americas marked the beginning of the European expansion which would lead to trans-Pacific contact between Asia and the West. Europeans began colonizing Southeast Asia from the 16th century onwards (though the vast majority was only colonized starting in the mid-19th century), with China also having some of its territory split up between the colonial powers. The Chinese artisans found themselves losing out to Western mass production, with China becoming an insignificant economic player in Pacific Asia.

The allure of easier access to and spreading civilizing influence over territories throughout the Pacific Rim incentivized America to expand westward, with its borders and influence reaching Asia by the mid-to-late 19th century in a kind of extended "Manifest Destiny", and America taking over Guam and the Philippines and dispelling the Spanish Empire from Pacific Asia in 1898. Japan, having been forced to open up by American naval force in the 1850s, became an industrial power and also played a role in conquering Pacific Asia around the same time, reaching the peak of its power when it drove European powers out of the region during World War 2.

=== Contemporary era ===
In the aftermath of World War 2 and Allied victory over Japan, America participated heavily throughout Pacific Asia, tolerating the authoritarianism that characterized the regimes in the region due to its need for anti-communist allies to prosecute the Cold War in Asia, and later for the war on terror.

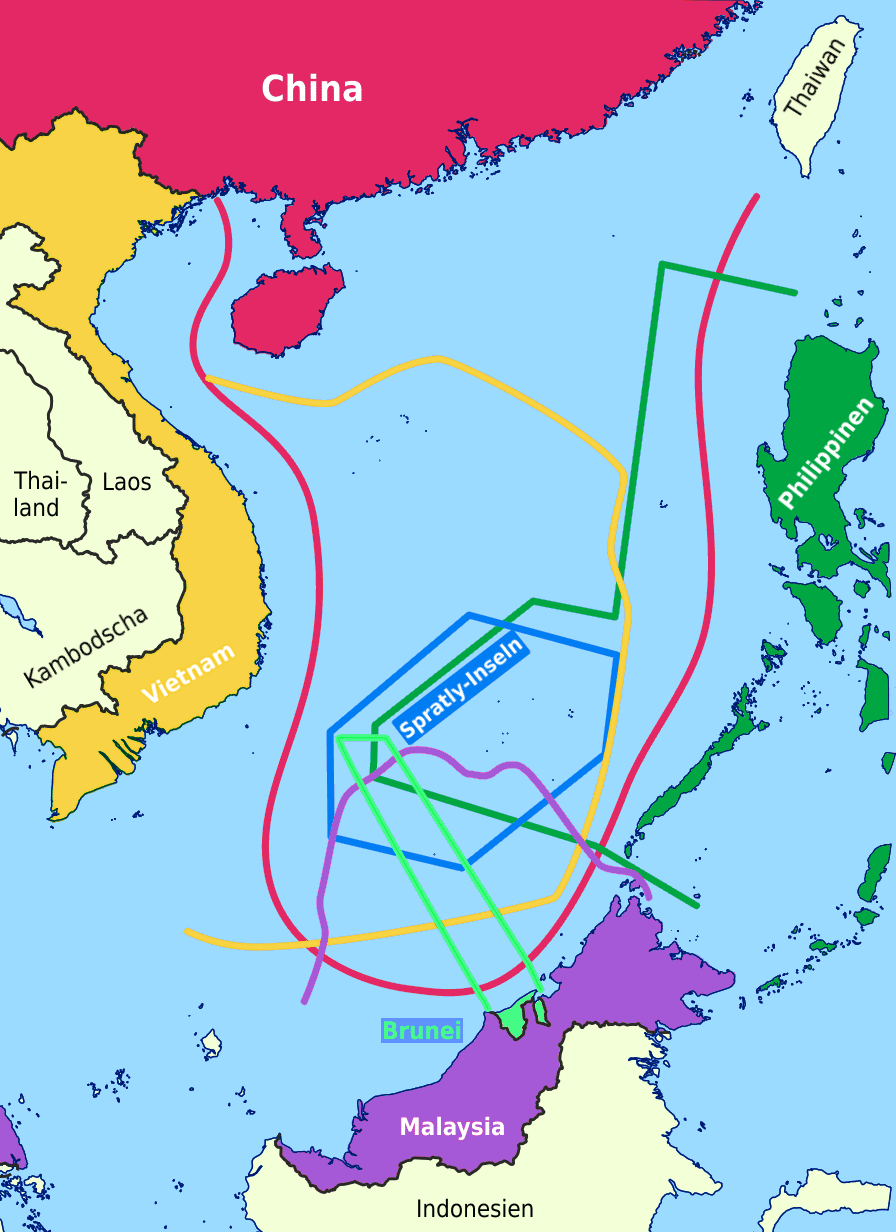
Pacific Asian territorial disputes in the South China Sea.

Deng Xiaoping's reforms in late-20th-century China led to the country becoming more economically important, re-assuming a central role in Pacific Asia during the 2008 financial crisis. In the 21st century, Pacific Asia has become an economically interconnected region, trading more within itself than the EU or America, having significant intermigration throughout the region, and having significant solidarity in its votes and stances at the UN. Tensions have emerged between Pacific Asian countries around the South China Sea (such as regarding Taiwan) and regarding the Korean conflict, with Japan having somewhat of a leadership role in the region but also being rejected at times due to other Pacific Asian countries' reaction to colonial-era Japanese war crimes, with America being asked to maintain influence in the region as a counterweight to Japan.

The desire of Pacific Rim countries to counterbalance China has led to India's increasing involvement in multiple coalitions throughout the region as part of the broader Indo-Pacific.

== See also ==
- Asian relations with Northeast India
- East Asia Economic Caucus
- Global Southeast, which intersects with Pacific Asia in Southeast Asia
- Greater East Asia Co-Prosperity Sphere, a historical region
- Indo-Pacific
- Pacific Rim, the entire region of the world surrounding the Pacific Ocean
