= Macclesfield Bank =

Underwater atoll in the South China Sea

Disputed reefs and shoals
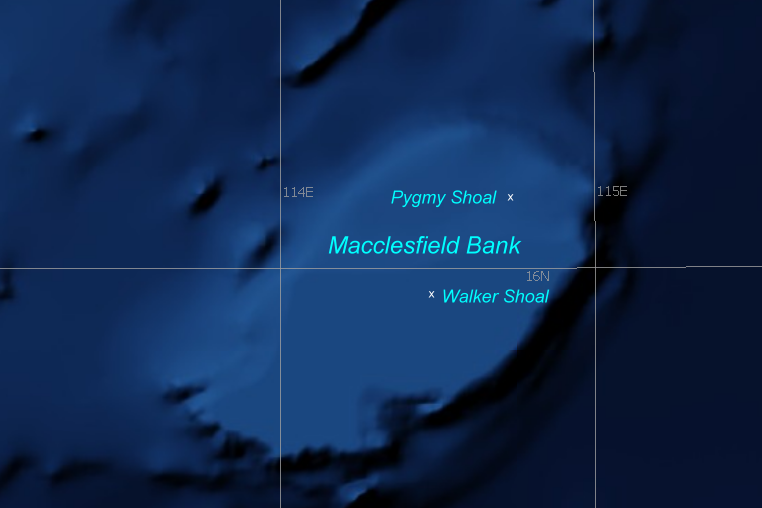
- Macclesfield Bank
- Interactive map of Macclesfield Bank
- Other name: Middle Sand Islands

Geography
- Location: South China Sea
- Coordinates: 16°00′N 114°30′E
- Total islands: 0
- Major islands: None
- Area: 6,448 km^{2} (2,490 sq mi) total, 0 km^{2} land surface/islets
- Length: 130 km (81 mi)
- Width: 70 km (43 mi)
- Highest elevation: −9.2 m (-30.2 ft)
- Highest point: Unnamed point below sea level

Administration
- People's Republic of China
- Prefecture-level city Province: Sansha Hainan

Claimed by
- Republic of China (Taiwan)
- Municipality: Kaohsiung

Demographics
- Population: None

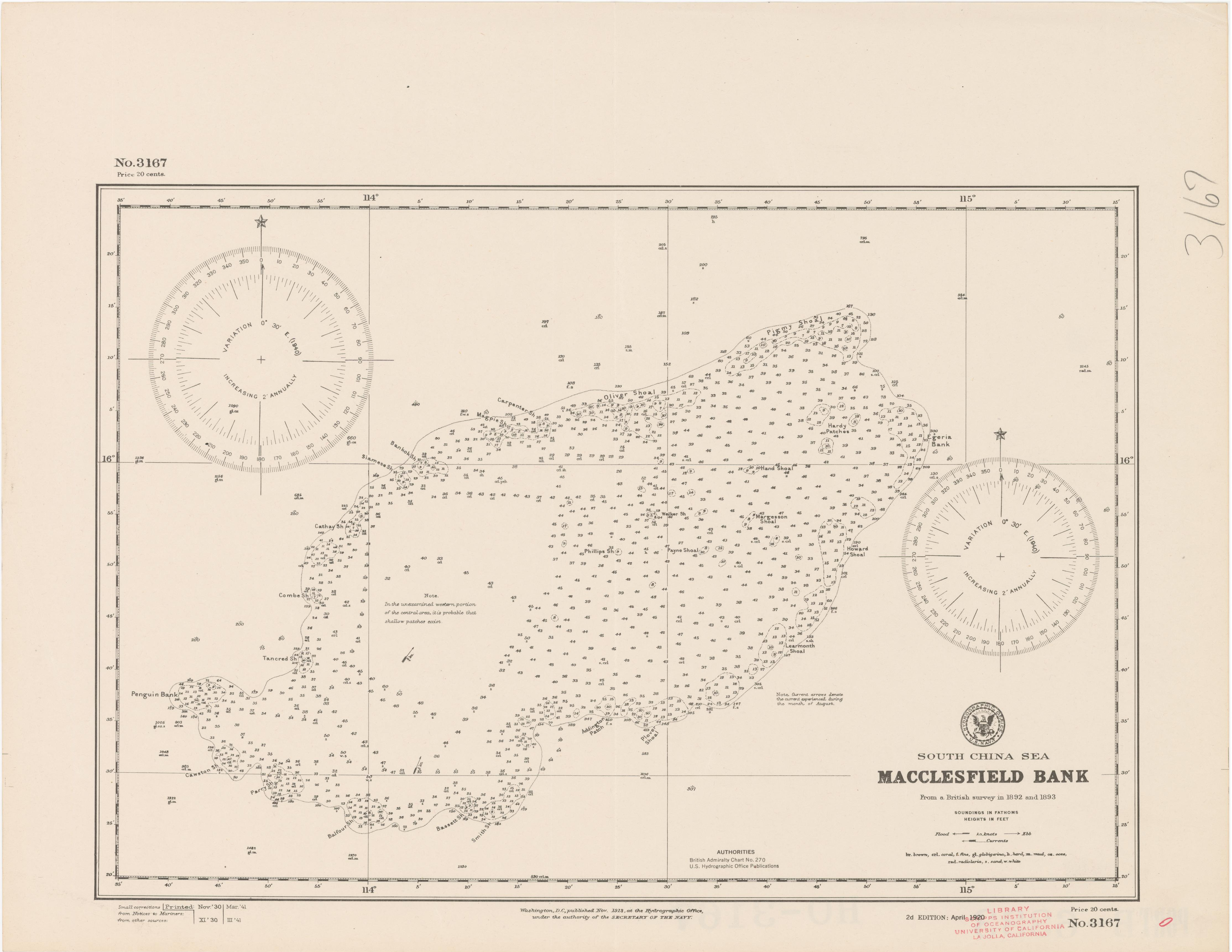
A 1920 American nautical chart, based on British surveys - depths in fathoms

Macclesfield Bank is an elongated sunken atoll of underwater reefs and shoals in the South China Sea. It lies east of the Paracel Islands, southwest of Pratas Island and north of the Spratly Islands. It is about 130 km (81 mi) long from southwest to northeast, and about 70 km (43 mi) wide at its broadest part. With an ocean area of 6,448 km^{2} (2,490 sq mi) it is one of the largest atolls in the world. The Macclesfield Bank is part of what China calls the Zhongsha Islands, which includes a number of geographically separate submarine features, and also refers to a county-level administrative division.

== History ==
Macclesfield banks reportedly were named after British ship named Macclesfield, though there is some ambiguity which vessel this was. By one account, the vessel was the British East India Company East Indiaman Macclesfield, which mapped and recorded the shoals in early 1701 on her way back to England from China. An alternative origin story attributes the name to an HMS Macclesfield that reportedly ran aground in the vicinity of these shoals in 1804. (Note: One problem with this attribution is that there is no record of any Royal Navy vessel named HMS Macclesfield. Furthermore, there is no record of an East Indiaman named Macclesfield in 1804. Nor is there any record of a Bombay country ship, or a Calcutta country ship, named Macclesfield.)

In April 1888 HMS Rambler, under the command of William Usborne Moore, with Percy Bassett-Smith as Surgeon-Naturalist, mapped the banks. They found a depth of 40 to 50 fathoms (73 to 91 m) inside the bank, with the rim rising to within 9 fathoms (16 m) of the surface. Dredging found live corals, showing that although entirely submerged, the bank was an actively growing reef.

== Geography ==
The broken coral reef rim of Macclesfield Bank, with a width of up to 8 km (5 mi), has depths of 11.8 m (39 ft) at Pygmy Shoal on the northeast end of the bank and depths of 11.6 to 18 m (59 ft) elsewhere. Within the lagoon, Walker Shoal marks the least known depth of 9.2 metres (30 ft). In general, the central lagoon is very deep, with depths up to 100 metres (330 ft). While the bank is everywhere submerged, with no drying shoals, it is usually visible due to the turbulence it causes, the seas becoming "high and confused" in heavy weather.

The elongated atoll consists of the following shoals, clockwise starting in the northeast, and at the end the six named shoals in the lagoon:

English Name	Romanized Name	Chinese Name	Coordinates	least depth (fathoms)
Pigmy (Pygmy) Shoal	Biwei Ansha	比微暗沙	16°13′N 114°44′E	7
Engeria (Egeria) Bank	Yinji Tan	隱磯灘	16°03′N 114°56′E	10
Howard Shoal	Wuyong Ansha	武勇暗沙	15°52′N 114°47′E	10
Learmonth Shoal	Jimeng Ansha	濟猛暗沙	15°42′N 114°41′E	9
Plover Shoal	Haijiu Ansha	海鳩暗沙	15°36′N 114°28′E	10
Addington Patch	Anding Lianjiao	安定連礁	15°37′N 114°24′E	10
Smith Shoal	Meixi Ansha	美溪暗沙	15°27′N 114°12′E	9
Bassett Shoal	Bude Ansha	布德暗沙	15°27′N 114°10′E	9
Balfour Shoal	Bofu Ansha	波洑暗沙 or 波伏暗沙	15°27′N 114°00′E	8
Parry Shoal	Paibo Ansha	排波暗沙	15°29′N 113°51′E	8
Cawston Shoal	Guodian Ansha	果淀暗沙	15°32′N 113°46′E	10
Penguin Bank	Paihong Tan	排洪灘	15°38′N 113°43′E	9
Tancred Shoal	Taojing Ansha	濤靜暗沙	15°41′N 113°54′E	10
Combe Shoal	Kongpai Ansha	控湃暗沙	15°48′N 113°54′E	7
Cathy (Cathay) Shoal	Huaxia Ansha	華夏暗沙	15°54′N 113°58′E	7
Siamese Shoal	Simen Ansha	西門暗沙	15°58′N 114°03′E	9
Bankok Shoal	Bengu Ansha	本固暗沙	16°00′N 114°06′E	7
Magpie Shoal	Meibin Ansha	美濱暗沙	16°03′N 114°13′E	8
Carpenter Shoal	Luban Ansha	魯班暗沙	16°04′N 114°18′E	8
Oliver Shoal	Zhongbei Ansha	中北暗沙	16°07′N 114°24′E	7
Hardy Patches^{1}	Shitang Lianjiao	石塘連礁	16°02′N 114°46′E	8
Hand Shoal^{1}	Zhizhang Ansha	指掌暗沙	16°00′N 114°39′E	9
Margesson Shoal^{1}	Nanfei Ansha	南扉暗沙	15°55′N 114°38′E	8
Walker Shoal^{1}	Manbu Ansha	漫步暗沙	15°55′N 114°29′E	5
Phillip's Shoal^{1}	Lexi Ansha	樂西暗沙	15°52′N 114°25′E	9
Payne Shoal^{1}	Pingnan Ansha	屏南暗沙	15°52′N 114°34′E	8

^{1} inside lagoon

== Territorial claims ==
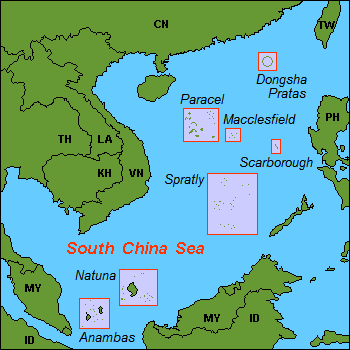
South China Sea

Macclesfield Bank is claimed, in whole or in part, by China and Taiwan (Republic of China).

Jose Zaide, a Filipino diplomat of ambassadorial rank, has written that the Philippines does not claim the Macclesfield Bank. Moreover, Macclesfield Bank is not within UNCLOS 200 or Philippines EEZ.

As the bank is entirely underwater, some scholars have raised questions regarding the legality of territorial claims upon it with regards to the United Nations Convention on the Law of the Sea (UNCLOS). However, the Philippines filed claim for another underwater feature, the Benham Rise, in 2008 in compliance with the requirements of UNCLOS and UN officially approved the claim in April 2012.

== See also ==
- Sansha
- Scarborough Shoal
- South China Sea
