= Zhongsha Islands =

Zhongsha Islands 中沙岛礁镇
- Town
- Zhongsha Daojiao Town
- Location within South China Sea
- Country: People's Republic of China
- Province: Hainan
- Prefecture-level city: Sansha
- District: Xisha District

Government
  - Type: Town

Area
  - Total: 0.000003 km^{2} (1.2×10^{−6} sq mi)

Population
  - Total: 0
- Time zone: UTC+8 (China Standard Time)
- Territorial Dispute: There are on-going territorial disputes in the entire area covered by the town, whose administrative authority is not internationally recognized.

Zhongsha Archipelago
- Simplified Chinese: 中沙群岛
- Traditional Chinese: 中沙群島
- Literal meaning: Central Sands Archipelago
Transcriptions
Standard Mandarin
- Hanyu Pinyin: Zhōngshā Qúndǎo

Zhongsha District
- Simplified Chinese: 中沙群岛的岛礁及其海域
- Traditional Chinese: 中沙群島的島礁及其海域
- Literal meaning: Islands, Reefs, and Waters of the Zhongsha Archipelago
Transcriptions
Standard Mandarin
- Hanyu Pinyin: Zhōngshā Qúndǎo de Dǎo Jiāo jíqí Hǎiyù

The Zhongsha Islands is a Chinese term for a collection of two skerries, many entirely submerged banks, seamounts, and shoals in the South China Sea. There are no islands in the Macclesfield Bank, the main part of Zhongsha. The Scarborough Shoal, which consists of two skerries, is not contiguous with the Macclesfield Bank, but Chinese sources treat them as one chain of geographical features. The whole of the region is claimed by both the PRC and the ROC, and various bits of the eastern parts are claimed by the Philippines. No country has constant control of the whole region, and there are disputes, such as the Scarborough Shoal standoff.

The PRC claims to administer the area as Zhongsha Daojiao Town (Chinese: 中沙岛礁镇; pinyin: Zhōngshā Dǎojiāo Zhèn), a town under the Xisha District of the Sansha prefecture-level city in Hainan. It has one Village-level division, Zhongsha Daojiao Residential Community. However, the seat of this town and residential community is not within the Zhongsha Islets, but on Woody Island.

Aquaculture research has been conducted on Walker Shoal (Chinese: 漫步暗沙; pinyin: Mànbù Ànshā).

== Geography ==
The Zhongsha Islets include:

To the west, near the Paracel Islands:

- Macclesfield Bank (Zhongsha Dao)
  - Walker Shoal (Manbu Ansha 漫步暗沙; 15°55′N 114°29′E)

To the east, near Luzon:

- Scarborough Shoal (Nanyan Dao 南巖島 or Huangyan Dao 黃岩島; 15°11′N 117°46′E)
  - Nanyan skerry
  - Beiyan skerry
- Truro Shoal (Sianfa Ansha or Shianfa Ansha 特魯暗沙; 16°20′N 116°44′E)

To the north:

- Helen Shoal (Itung Ansha or Yitong Ansha 一統暗沙; 19°12′N 113°53′E)
- Stewart Shoal (Ssu-ti-wa-erh-t'e Ansha 管事暗灘; 17°20′N 118°50′E)
- Huangyan Seamount (黃岩海山; 15°7′N 117°51′E)
- Shixing Seamount (石星海山)
- Xianbei Seamount (憲北海山)
- Xiannan Seamount (憲南海山)
- Zhangzhong Seamount (漲中海山)
- Zhenbei Seamount (珍貝海山)

To the south, near the Spratly Islands:

- Dreyer Shoal (Zhongnan Ansha, 中南暗沙; 13°57′N 115°24′E)
- Zhongnan Seamount (中南海山)
- Longnan Seamount (龍南海山)
- Changlong Seamount (長龍海山)
