= North Sea Region =

Geographical region of Europe

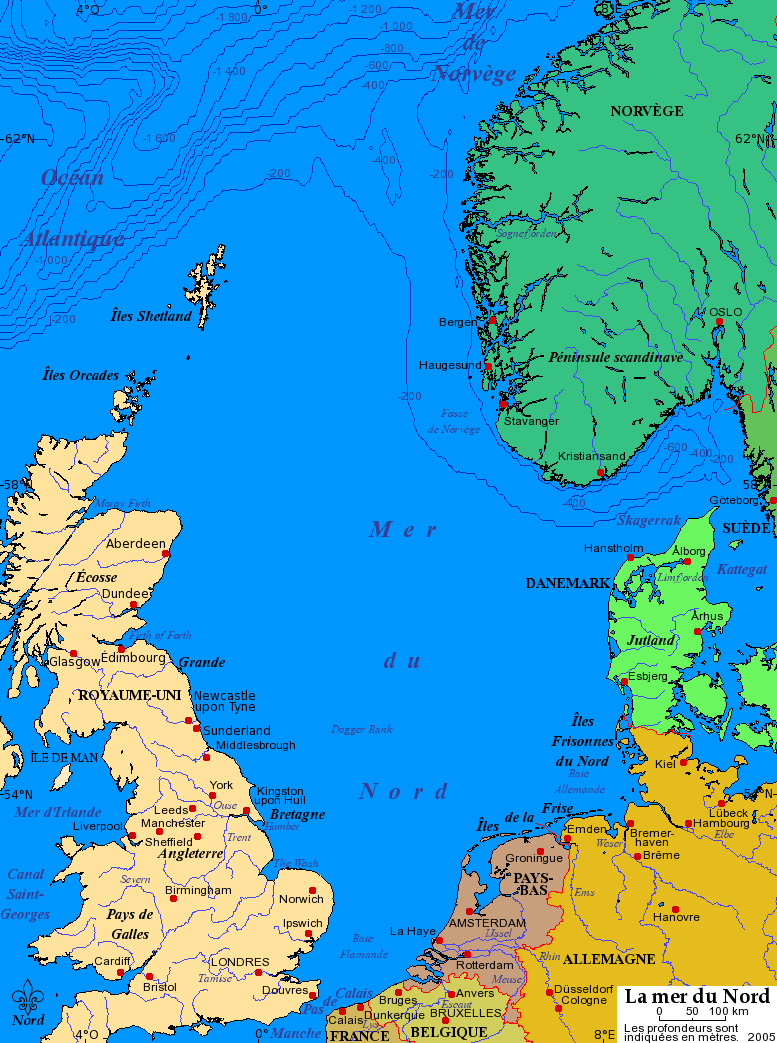
Map of the North Sea Area

The North Sea Region (NSR) of Europe refers to European countries and regions that have access to the North Sea. Cultural and economic co-operation has a strong tradition in the area, dating back to the Vikings and the Hanseatic League.

Although not a formally established entity, in political terms the North Sea Region is consolidated through international organisations like the North Sea Commission and transnational co-operation programmes like the North Sea Region Programme of the European Union.

== Geographic area ==
=== North Sea Commission ===
The partnership of the CPMR North Sea Commission consists of most Norwegian county councils (Trondelag, More og Romsdal, Vestland, Rogaland, Agder, Vestfold og Telemark and Viken), the regions Halland, Västra Götaland and Örebro in Sweden, the three Danish regions of Nordjylland, Midtjylland and Syddanmark, the German Länder Schleswig-Holstein, Lower Saxony and Bremen, all coastal provinces of the Netherlands (Groningen, Friesland, Drenthe, Flevoland, North Holland, South Holland and Zeeland) and the Province of West Flanders in Belgium as well as counties and authorities from eastern England (Southend-on-Sea) and Scotland (Aberdeen City, Aberdeenshire, Fife and Highland).

=== North Sea Region Programme – Cooperation Area ===
The North Sea Region, as defined in the Operational Programme of the Interreg North Sea Programme 2021-2027, covers an area of approximately 536,000 square kilometres (207,000 sq mi). The programme covers all of Denmark and the Netherlands, the southern part of Norway, the Flemish Region of Belgium, northwestern regions of Germany, southwestern parts of Sweden and northwestern regions of France.

Geographically, the region is connected by the large sea basin of the North Sea.

== Population ==
Based on the co-operation area of the North Sea Region Programme, about 61 million inhabitants (2023) live in the North Sea Region. The population density of the region varies widely, ranging from sparsely populated areas like Finnmark (1.5 per square kilometre (4/sq mi)) in Norway to densely inhabited urban centres like the German city of Hamburg (2,243/km^{2} (5,810/sq mi)).

== Economy ==
The North Sea Region belongs to the most prosperous parts of the European Union. The average level of GDP across the region was €28,516 per capita in 2002 ($26964.73 in 2002 conversion rate). The unemployment rate is below the EU average in most areas. However, there are notable differences concerning economic performance and employment between the areas in the North Sea Region.

The economic structure of the regions bordering the North Sea is undergoing considerable changes, such as shrinking labour markets in the agriculture and fisheries sector and a decline in old industrialised areas.

== See also ==
- North Sea
- North Sea Commission (NSC)
- North Sea Region Programme (NSRP)
