= List of languages of the North Sea =

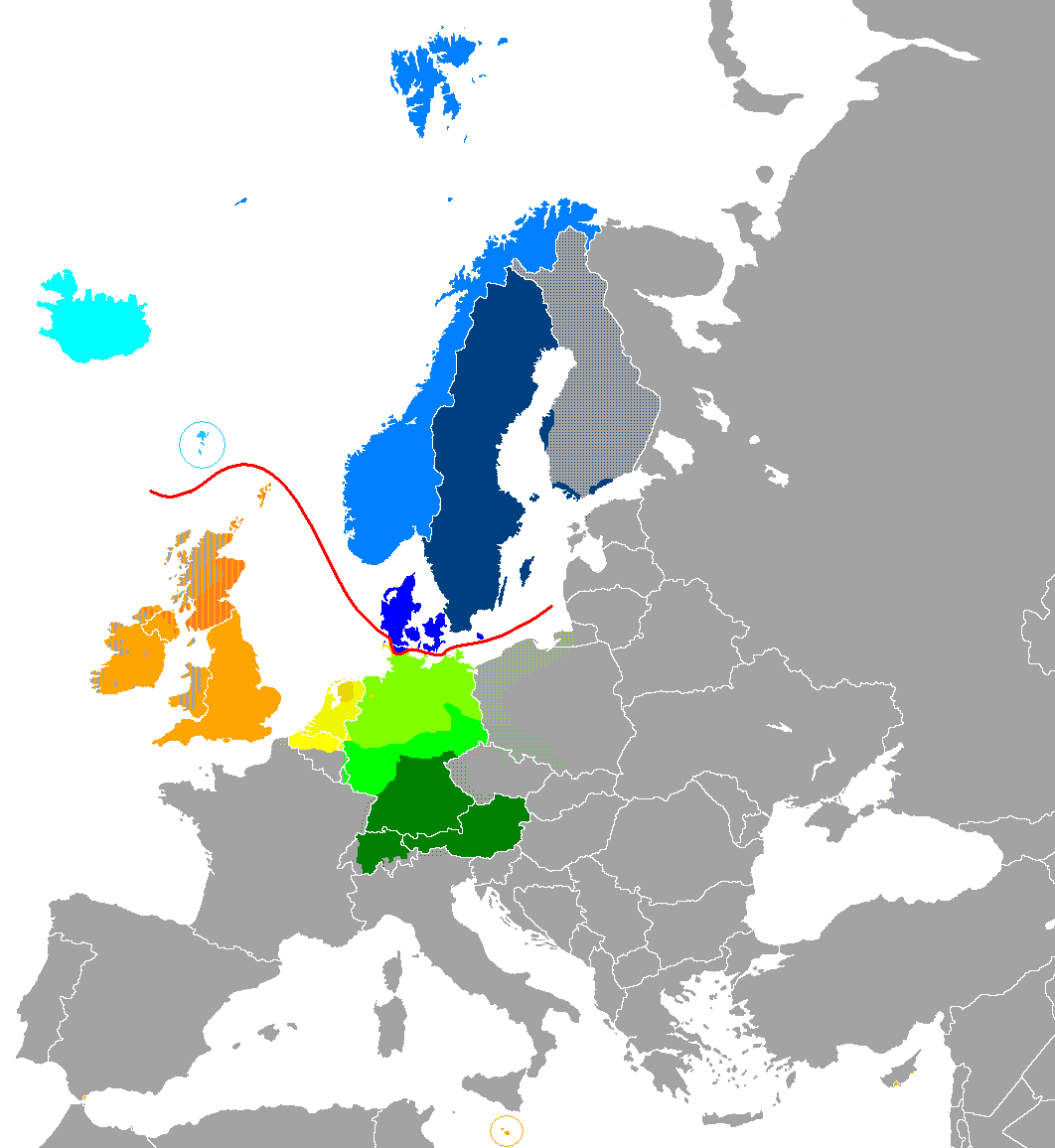
Extent of Germanic languages in present-day Europe: North Germanic languages; Icelandic; Faroese; Norwegian; Swedish; Danish; West Germanic languages; Scots; English; Frisian; Dutch; Flemish; Low German; Central German (High German); Upper German (High German); Dots indicate areas where it is common for L1 non-Germanic speakers to be L2 speakers of a neighbouring Germanic language.; Lines indicate areas where it is common for L1 Germanic speakers to be L2 speakers of a neighbouring non-Germanic or other Germanic language.

This is a list of the languages spoken on the shores of the North Sea. The majority are in the Germanic sub-family of Indo-European languages. In addition, French (a Romance language) and Scottish Gaelic (a Celtic language) are used in certain regions.

== North Germanic languages ==
- Danish
- Norwegian
- Swedish

== West Germanic languages ==
=== Anglo-Frisian languages ===
- English language
  - English English
  - Essex dialect
  - Estuary English
  - Geordie
  - Highland English
  - Mackem
  - Norfolk dialect
  - Suffolk dialect
  - Scottish English
  - Yorkshire dialect and accent
- Scots language
  - Doric
  - Northern Scots
  - Orcadian dialect
  - Shetland dialect
- Frisian languages
  - North Frisian
  - West Frisian

=== High German languages ===
- Standard German
- Yiddish

=== Low Franconian languages ===
- Dutch
  - Brabantian
  - Hollandic
  - Zeelandic
  - West Flemish

=== Low German ===
- Low German

== Romance languages ==
- French

== Celtic languages ==
- Scottish Gaelic

== Extinct languages ==
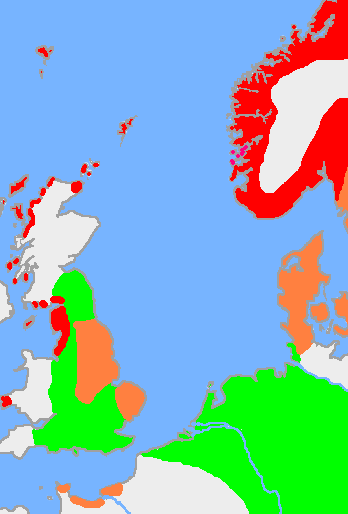
This is the approximate extent of Old Norse and related languages in the early 10th century around the North Sea. The red area is the distribution of the dialect Old West Norse; the orange area is the spread of the dialect Old East Norse. The pink area is Old Gutnish and the green area is the extent of the other Germanic languages with which Old Norse still retained some mutual intelligibility

- Old Norse (North Germanic). This evolved into the modern North Germanic language group, of which most except for Norn still survive.
  - Norn language. This was spoken in the Orkney and Shetland islands but was replaced by English/Scots in the 18th and 19th centuries. The last speaker died in the 19th century.
- Pictish language (Celtic). Was spoken in what is now Scotland in the early Middle Ages by the Picts. It was replaced by Scottish Gaelic and Old Norse in the 9th and 10th centuries.
- Old Brythonic language (Celtic) was spoken in Britain in the Iron Age, the Roman Era and the Sub-Roman Period. It was replaced by the Germanic dialects of the Anglo-Saxon invaders that would later be Old English.
