= Desertec =

Organization planning to install solar panels in the Sahara

DESERTEC
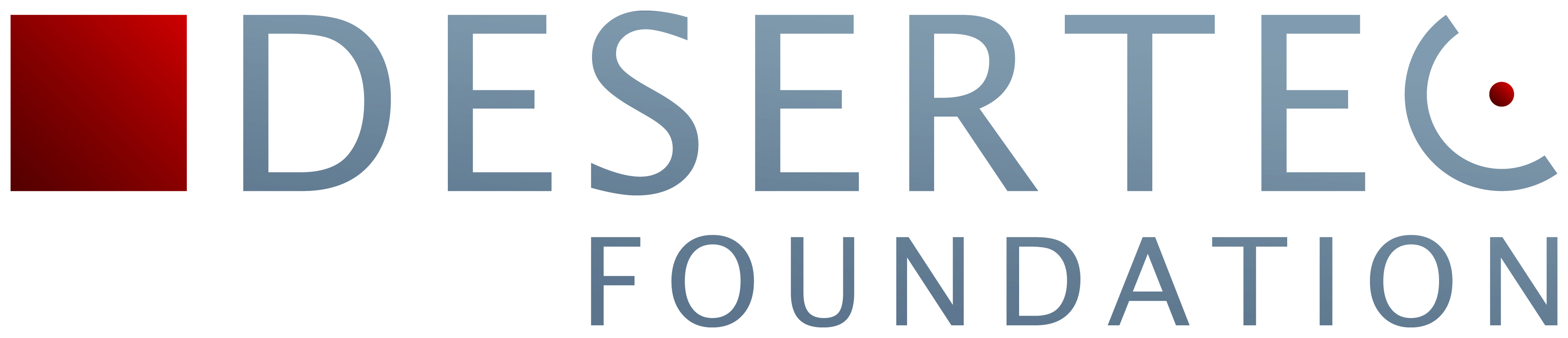
- Established: 2003; 20 January 2009
- Purpose: "To provide climate protection, energy security and development by generating sustainable power from the sites where renewable sources of energy are at their most abundant."
- Key people: Gerhard Knies, Inventor of the Desertec Concept; Timo Bracht, Michael Schröder, Hubert Schwingshandl, Directors of the Desertec Foundation
- Website: www.desertec.org

Desertec (Often: DESERTEC) is a non-profit foundation aimed at sustainably and ecologically producing electricity in sunny regions of the world. Sunny deserts are therefore the focus. The energy is intended to be used locally, but also exported to industrial regions, e.g., by means of High Voltage Direct Current (HVDC). Energy partnerships are intended to enable development prospects.

The concept for energy supply was developed by the Trans-Mediterranean Renewable Energy Cooperation (TREC), an international network of politicians, scientists, and economists. The Desertec Foundation emerged from this network and is a non-profit organization.

Several scientific studies, including those from the German DLR, suggest that the concept is feasible and can provide ecological and economic benefits for both Europe and Africa. However, photovoltaic and solar thermal power plants were not economically able to compete with fossil fuels locally or in Europe in the early 2010s, causing delays in the project's implementation.

After the price of solar thermal power plants and photovoltaics dropped significantly, initial pilot projects such as the Ouarzazate Power Plant (Al Noor Project, Morocco) and the Benban Solar Park (Egypt) were built.

== History of DESERTEC Foundation ==
=== Concept Development by TREC (2003-2008) ===
DESERTEC was developed by the Trans-Mediterranean Renewable Energy Cooperation (TREC), a voluntary organisation founded in 2003 by the Club of Rome and the National Energy Research Center Jordan, made up of scientists and experts from across Europe, the Middle East and North Africa (EU-MENA). It is from this network that the DESERTEC Foundation later emerged as a non-profit organisation and started to promote their solutions around the world. Founding members of the foundation are the German Association of the Club of Rome, members of the network of scientists TREC as well as committed private supporters and long-time promoters of the DESERTEC idea. In 2009, the DESERTEC Foundation founded the Munich-based industrial initiative together with partners from the industrial and finance sectors. It aims to accelerate the implementation of the DESERTEC Concept in the focus region EU-MENA.

Scientific studies done by the German Aerospace Center (DLR) between 2004 and 2007 demonstrated that the desert sun could meet rising power demand in the MENA region while also helping to power Europe, reduce carbon emissions across the EU-MENA region and power desalination plants to provide freshwater to the MENA region. Dii published a further study called Desert Power 2050 in June 2012. It found that the MENA region would be able to meet its needs for power with renewable energy, while exporting its excess power to create an export industry with an annual volume of more than €60 billion. Meanwhile, by importing desert power, Europe could save around 30 pounds/MWh.

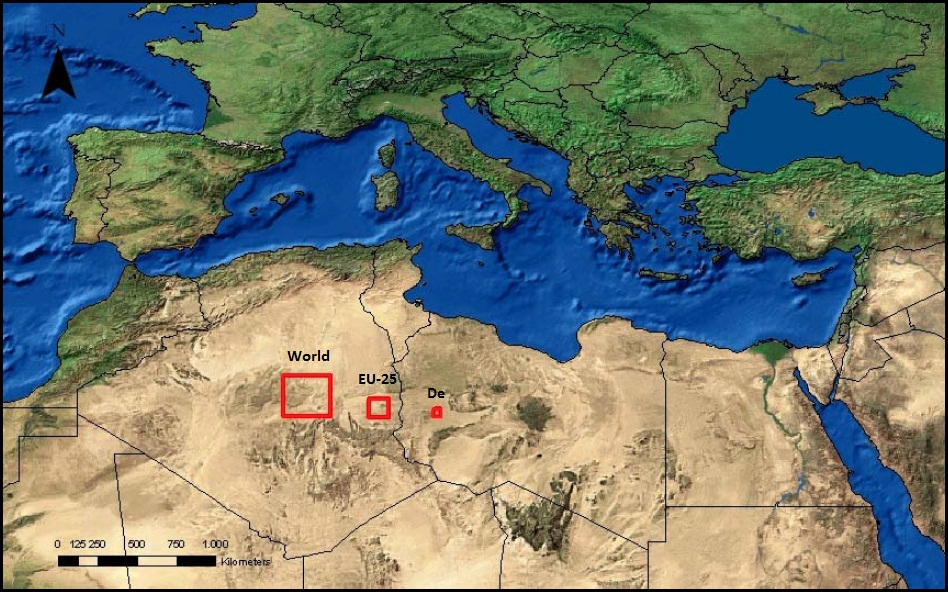
The red squares represent the area that would be enough for solar power plants to produce a quantity of electricity consumed (as of 2005) by the world, the European Union (EU-25) and Germany (De). To replace all energy consumption (not just electricity), areas about 5 times as large would suffice. Data provided by the German Aerospace Centre (DLR), 2005.

The DESERTEC concept originated from Dr Gerhard Knies, a German particle physicist and founder of the Trans-Mediterranean Renewable Energy Cooperation (TREC) network of researchers. In 1986, in the wake of the Chernobyl nuclear accident, he was searching for a potential alternative source of clean energy and arrived at a conclusion: in six hours, the world's deserts receive more energy from the sun than humankind consumes in a year. The DESERTEC concept was developed further by TREC – an international network of scientists, experts and politicians from the field of renewable energies – founded in 2003 by the Club of Rome and the National Energy Research Center Jordan. One of the most famous members was Prince Hassan bin Talal of Jordan. In 2009, TREC emerged to the non-profit DESERTEC Foundation.

=== Founding and restructuring (2009-2014) ===
The DESERTEC Foundation was founded in 2009 to communicate the DESERTEC concept to the public and connect decision-makers from science, politics, and business. In the same year, the Desertec Foundation and 12 partners established the private initiative Dii, with the goal of meeting 15% of Europe's electricity demand through solar power from North Africa. In 2010 the DESERTEC University Network was established to encourage knowledge transfer between universities.

In 2012, a knowledge platform was launched to simplify international knowledge exchange and collaboration within the Desertec community. This project was funded by the German Federal Environmental Foundation (DBU).

Projects have been considered in Morocco, Algeria, and Tunisia.

In Morocco, the state-owned "Moroccan Agency for Sustainable Energy" (MASEN) is a project initiator, aimed at advancing Morocco's energy transition through pilot projects. MASEN was founded in 2010 and reached out to Desertec to plan initial pilot projects. Desertec was also in communication with Algerian politics. On December 9, 2011, during a meeting between Algeria and the EU in Brussels, the CEO of the Algerian state electricity company Sonelgaz – in the presence of Algerian Energy Minister Youcef Yousfi and EU Energy Commissioner Günther Oettinger – signed a cooperation agreement. The focus of this strategic partnership is to strengthen and exchange technical expertise, seek means and ways to access foreign markets, and promote the joint development of renewable energies in Algeria and abroad. Despite the members from the private sector, the industrial initiative was unable to implement any projects, leading the Desertec Foundation to engage with the World Bank to carry out pilot projects, which, however, delayed the implementation. Most of the partners of the industrial initiative and the Desertec Foundation subsequently left the consortium. The industrial initiative was dissolved in its previous form. Three remaining partners and advisors of the industrial initiative then founded Dii-Desert Energy (see similar initiatives), which focuses more on consulting the energy industry on the Arabian Peninsula. The company has since been based in Dubai.

Various actors and observers attributed the delay to several factors. A key issue for the partners of the industrial initiative was the lack of a business case at the time, as solar thermal power plants and photovoltaics in the early 2010s could not compete with fossil power plants without government subsidies.

The Desertec Foundation criticized that joint energy partnerships between Europe and Africa have been possible for decades when it comes to fossil fuels. However, when it comes to renewable energy, concerns about supply security, terrorism targeting infrastructure, and political instability hinder the expansion of renewables: North Africa supplied 11-15% of Europe's gas consumption between 2005 and 2023 and remains one of Europe's main gas suppliers to this day.

There has never been a long-term interruption of gas supply due to terrorist attacks on pipelines, nor has Europe been cut off from supply for political reasons. Even during the Arab Spring, there were no interruptions in gas supply. In neither Morocco nor Tunisia has a terrorist group ever successfully targeted the energy infrastructure. Only in Algeria was there a significant attack on a gas field, which occurred in 2013 and blocked the Amenas facility for four days.

Despite large collaborations between Europe and North Africa in the fossil energy sector and support for the Desertec concept by North African politics, the implementation of the first pilot projects was delayed. Multiple media outlets in 2013 and 2014 considered this delay to be the failure of the project, even though preparations for the implementation of a pilot project were still ongoing, and these soon resulted in the commencement of pilot plant construction.

=== Implementation of first pilot projects (2014-2023) ===
To implement the first pilot projects, the Desertec Foundation increasingly focused on networking local political stakeholders with funding banks. Under the leadership of the World Bank, which established a funding program for the implementation of solar thermal energy in North Africa, construction of the Al Noor power plant complex in Ouarzazate, Morocco, began in 2013, with the first phase completed in 2016. The project was expanded in several stages, which were completed in 2018.

In Egypt, the construction of the [Benban Solar Park] began in 2018, funded by BayernLB and the Arab African International Bank. The project was completed in 2019 and is one of the largest solar parks in the world.

In 2020, the Desertec Foundation published a study on the feasibility of a power line from North Africa to Europe (see Desertec studies). The results of the study were promoted in discussions with Italian and Tunisian decision-makers. On June 16, 2022, the Desertec Foundation initiated an energy symposium in Rome with the Senator of Sicily, Pietro Lorefice, where decision-makers from politics, business, and science gathered.

== Similar Projects ==
=== Changji-Guquan-Transmission-Line in Gobi-Desert ===
The People's Republic of China is also increasingly utilizing desert regions to expand its share of renewable energy. The Gobi Desert plays a particularly crucial role in this effort. Similar to the Desertec concept, the Changji-Guquan transmission line connects desert regions with urban centers. Completed in 2019, the line stretches over 3,000 km and has a total capacity of 12 GW. Since this transmission capacity can replace multiple coal-fired power plants, solar thermal power plants were also integrated to replicate the load profile of coal power using renewable energy sources. As a result, a combination of solar thermal energy, photovoltaics, and wind power enables the continuous supply of electricity to urban centers around the clock.

The Al Maktoum Solar Park Complex in Dubai is one of the largest solar parks in the world. The project consists of multiple development phases. The fourth phase was completed in December 2023 and includes the world's largest solar thermal power plant.

Although photovoltaics and wind power have undercut coal and gas prices in a number of countries, this is partly due to subsidies or additional costs imposed on fossil fuels, such as taxes on emissions or the legally mandated purchase of emission certificates. Additionally, integrating weather-dependent energy sources like PV and wind into the power grid incurs further costs, particularly storage costs, which do not apply to solar thermal power plants.

=== Australian-Asian-Power-Link ===
There are also efforts in Australia to export electricity generated in the desert to other countries. Singapore, in particular, has expressed interest in purchasing electricity from Australia.

=== Dii GmbH ===
The Dii Gmbh is a clean energy market enabler and industry network independent from the DESERTEC Foundation, which emerged from people and shareholders previously engaged with the Desertec Industrial Initiative. The Desertec Industrial Initiative was dissolved in its original form in 2014, after the withdrawal of most shareholders and the DESERTEC Foundation. The remaining shareholders reformed into the Dii GmbH, active from its base in Dubai (UAE) under the brandname of Dii Desert Energy (www.dii-desertenegy.org). The original Industrial Initiative, which was the precursor to the Dii GmbH, was founded by 12 European companies in Munich on 30 October 2009. These companies were led by Munich Re and included, among others, Deutsche Bank, E.ON, RWE, and Abengoa.

Originally the Industrial Initiative consisted of 17 associate partners:

- (Switzerland) ABB
- (Spain) Abengoa Solar
- (Saudi Arabia) ACWA Power
- (Algeria) Cevital
- (Germany) Deutsche Bank
- (Italy) Enel Green Power
- (Germany) E.ON
- (United States) First Solar
- (Germany) Flagsol
- (Germany) HSH Nordbank
- (Germany) Munich Re
- (Morocco) Nareva
- (Spain) Red Eléctrica de España
- (Germany) RWE
- (France) Avancis
- (Germany) Schott Solar
- (Italy) Terna
- (Greece) Terna Energy SA
- (Italy) UniCredit
- State Grid Corporation of China

At the end of 2014, most shareholders left Dii which has been described both as a "failure" and as a reorientation toward 'net zero emissions' in MENA and positioning MENA to become a major clean energy exporter. The reformed Dii GmbH was not able to convince most of the shareholders to join their venture. In 2026 about 110 international companies are partner of Dii's network.

(Germany) RWE, State Grid Corporation of China, (Saudi Arabia) ACWA Power and a number of partner companies joined the Dii GmbH and the company focuses on the new mission of accelerating the energy transition on the Arabian Peninsula.

=== X-Links ===
The X-Links project aims to connect Morocco and the United Kingdom via an undersea cable. In August 2023, the British government granted the project a status of "national importance," which is intended to expedite the approval process.

Initial funds have also been acquired for the project's development. Since the project mainly relies on photovoltaics and wind power, rather than a combination of photovoltaics and solar thermal energy as initially planned in the Desertec concept, some British observers see a stronger competition with wind farms that the United Kingdom aims to develop in the North Sea. Both photovoltaics and wind provide weather-dependent electricity, thus serving different market segments compared to solar thermal power plants, which directly compete with coal and gas plants for night-time power, baseload, or reserve contracts. The X-Links team intends to store electricity using batteries, which is more expensive than utilizing solar thermal energy. Therefore, the project plans to offset the price difference with a "Contracts-for-Difference" agreement with the UK government. However, the British government has (as of now) not yet guaranteed such a purchase agreement. The use of solar thermal energy has been ruled out to avoid the higher technical planning effort involved in project development.

== Political Context ==
=== Energy Economics in North Africa ===
The MENA region (Middle East; North Africa) derives only a small share of its energy consumption from solar energy, despite high solar radiation. Among the countries with the highest solar production, none belong to the MENA region. Only Morocco, which was the first to implement solar thermal power plants in Ouarzazate, has made significant progress in expanding renewable energies.

The North African countries have an extensive power grid with low outage rates, but the infrastructure, particularly supply chains and skilled personnel for the expansion of solar power plants, is only available to a limited extent.

Economic factors in particular hinder the expansion of renewable energies in North Africa: The photovoltaic market is dominated by China, with most suppliers outside of China coming from Europe and North America. Complete solar modules are not produced in Africa, except for a few providers in South Africa. Additionally, components necessary for grid infrastructure, such as inverters and transformers, are hardly manufactured in (North) Africa.

Due to the unfavorable exchange rate for imports, the development of renewable energies remains expensive despite geographical advantages, especially since importing components negatively impacts the countries' trade balance. In contrast, fossil fuels benefit from existing infrastructure, frequent subsidies, and well-established networks of decision-makers in politics and business. Additionally, Algeria and Egypt, in particular, have large natural gas reserves, meaning that the use of fossil fuels does not place a one-sided burden on the trade balance.

The Desertec concept aims to address these challenges in the expansion of renewable energies through a trans-Mediterranean energy cooperation. By exporting green electricity, the trade balance of North African countries is expected to be balanced, with the foreign currency earnings from exports enabling them to more easily purchase components for the energy transition on the global market. The foreign currency is also intended to facilitate the purchase of investment goods to establish local supply chains for energy technology. In implementing the concept, the Desertec Foundation hopes that, through exports, European electricity customers will help finance the energy transition in North Africa, so that these countries do not have to incur debt. A number of African states are going into debt, particularly with the People's Republic of China, to build their own infrastructure.

=== Political Obstacles ===
Some experts – such as Professor Tony Day, director of the Centre for Efficient and Renewable Energy in Building at London South Bank University, Henry Wilkinson of Janusian Security Risk Management, and Wolfram Lacher of Control Risks consultancy – are concerned about political obstacles to the project. Generating so much of the electricity consumed in Europe and in Africa would create a political dependency on North African countries which had corruption before Arab Spring and a lack of cross-border coordination. Moreover, DESERTEC would require extensive economic and political cooperation between Algeria and Morocco, which is at risk as the border between the two countries is closed due to a disagreement over the Western Sahara, Inram Kada by EUMENA, is responsible for expediting the project. Cooperation between the states of Europe and the states of the Middle East and North Africa is also certain to be challenging. Large scale cooperation necessary between the EU and the North African nations the project may be delayed due to bureaucratic red tape and other factors such as expropriation of assets.

There are also concerns that the water requirement for the solar plant to clean dust off panels and for turbine coolant may be detrimental to local populations in terms of the demand it will place on the local water supply. An EU innovation supported project however resulted in the development of a silicone based film with a nano-dendrite structure on it. The film is fused on top of the solar panels and the nano-dendrite structure makes that sand, water, salt, bacteria, molds, etc. can't attach to the photovoltaic panels. Opposed to this, studies point out the generation of fresh water by the solar thermal plants. Furthermore, no significant amount of water is needed for cleaning and cooling, since alternative technologies can be used (dry cleaning, dry cooling). However, dry cooling is more expensive, technologically challenging and less efficient than the water cooling currently planned. Plans for water desalination for cooling purposes are not part of the DESERTEC business plan or cost estimates as proposed.

The late Hermann Scheer (Eurosolar) pointed out that the doubled solar radiation in the Sahara can not be the only criterion especially with its continuous trade winds there being problematic.

Transmitting energy over long distances has been criticized, with questions raised over the cost of cabling compared to energy generation, and over electricity losses. However, the study and current operating technology show that electricity losses using high-voltage direct current transmission amount to only 3% per 1,000 km (10% per 3,000 km).

Investment may be required within Europe in a "supergrid". In response, one proposal is to cascade power between neighbouring states so that states draw on the power generation of neighbouring states rather than from distant desert sites.

One key question will be the cultural aspect, as Middle Eastern and African nations may need assurance that they will own the project rather than it being imposed from Europe.

== Technology ==
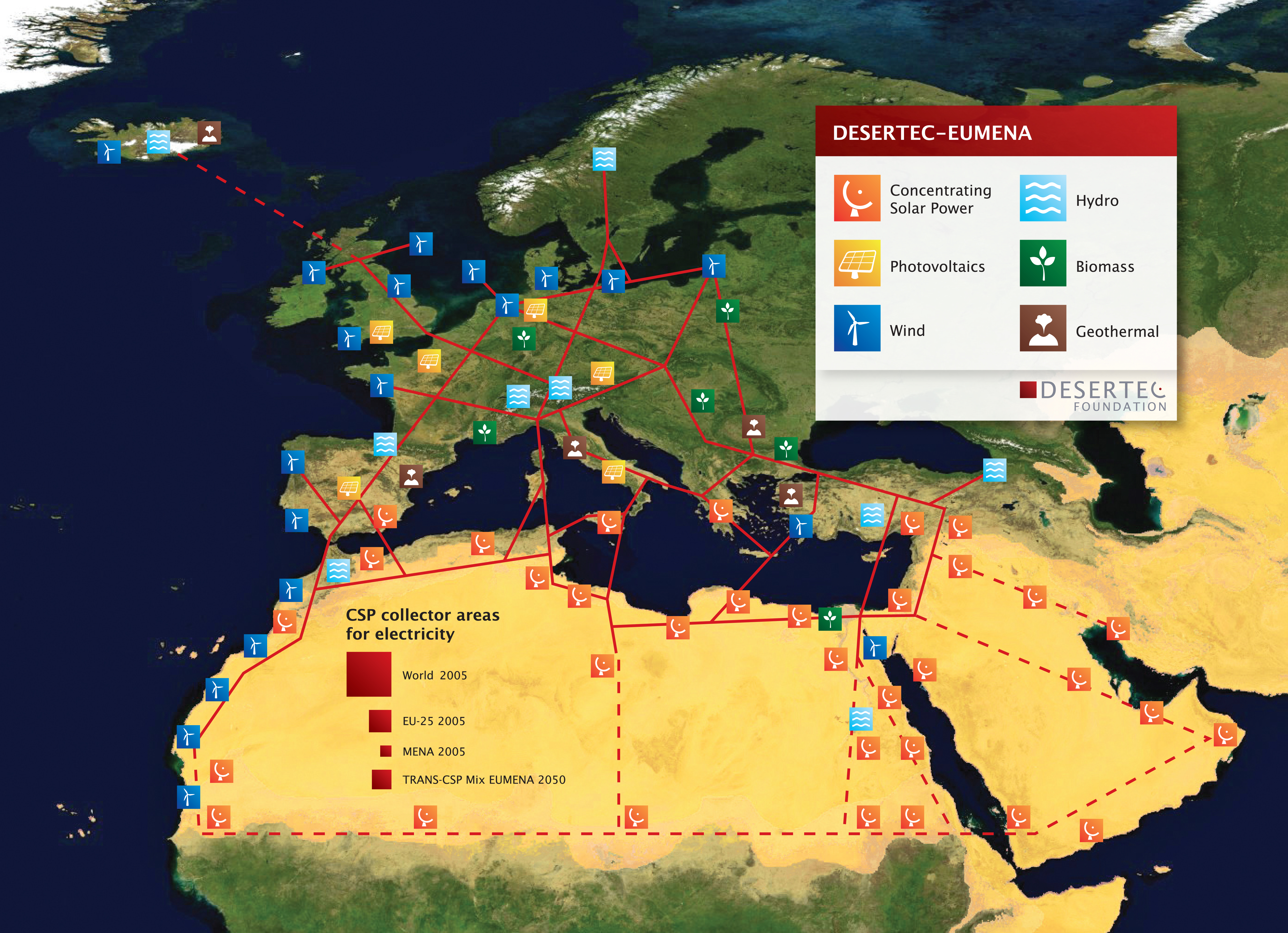
Sketch of possible infrastructure for a sustainable supply of power to Europe, the Middle East and North Africa (EU-MENA) (Source: DESERTEC Foundation, www.desertec.org)

=== Concentrated solar power ===
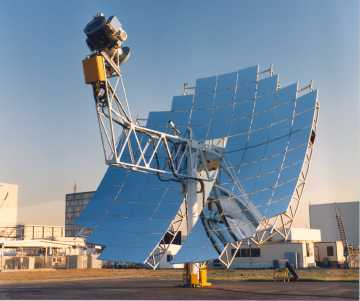
Dish Stirling

Concentrated solar power (also called concentrating solar power and CSP) systems use mirrors or lenses to concentrate a large area of sunlight, or solar thermal energy, onto a small area. Electrical power is produced when the concentrated light is converted to heat, which drives a heat engine (usually a steam turbine) connected to an electrical power generator. Molten salt can be employed as a thermal energy storage method to retain thermal energy collected by a solar tower or solar trough so that it can be used to generate electricity in bad weather or at night. Since solar fields feed their heat energy into a conventional generation unit with a steam turbine, they can be combined without any problem with fossil fuel hybrid power plants. This hybridisation secures energy supply also in unfavourable weather and at night without the need of accelerating costly compensatory plants. A technical challenge is the cooling which is necessary for every heating power system. Dii is therefore reliant either on an adequate water supply, coastal facilities or improved cooling technology.

=== Photovoltaics ===
Dii also considers photovoltaics (PV) as a technology suitable for desert power plants. Photovoltaics is a method of generating electrical power by converting solar radiation into direct current electricity using semiconductors. Photovoltaic power generation employs solar panels composed of a number of solar cells containing a photovoltaic material. Materials presently used for photovoltaics include monocrystalline silicon, polycrystalline silicon, amorphous silicon, cadmium telluride, and copper indium gallium selenide/sulfide. Driven by advances in technology and increases in manufacturing scale and sophistication, the cost of photovoltaics has declined steadily since the first solar cells were manufactured.

In 2010, First Solar, a producer of thin film solar panels, joined Dii as associated partner. The US based company already has experience with huge PV installations, and has constructed the 550 megawatt Desert Sunlight Solar Farm and Topaz Solar Farm in California, which are the biggest two PV installations of the world.

=== Wind energy ===
As also parts of the desert regions in the Middle East and North Africa (MENA) come with high wind potential, Dii is examining in which geographic regions the installation of wind farms is suitable. Wind turbines produce electricity by wind turning the blades, which spin a shaft, which connects to a generator which produces electricity. The Sahara Desert is one of the windiest areas on the planet, especially on the western coast where lies the Atlantic coastal desert along Western Sahara and Mauritania. The annual average wind speed at the ground greatly exceeds 5 m/s in most of the desert, and even approach 8 m/s or 9 m/s along the western ocean coast. It's important to note that wind speed increases with height. The regularity and the constancy of winds in arid regions are major assets for wind energy, too. The winds blow nearly constantly over the desert and there are generally no windless days throughout the year. Therefore, the desert of North Africa is also an ideal location to install large-scale wind parks and wind turbines with good productivity.

=== High-voltage direct current (HVDC) ===
Existing links Under construction Proposed

To export renewable energy produced in the MENA desert region, a high-voltage direct current (HVDC) electric power transmission system is needed. High Voltage DC (HVDC) technology is a proven and economical method of power transmission over long distances and also a trusted method to connect asynchronous grids or grids of different frequencies. With HVDC energy can also be transported in both directions. For long-distance transmission HVDC suffers lower electrical losses than alternating current (AC) transmission. Because of the higher solar radiation in MENA, the production of energy, even with the included transmissions losses, is still advantageous over the production in South Europe.

Also long distance projects have already been realised with technological cooperation from ABB and Siemens – both shareholders of Dii; namely the 800 kV HVDC Xiangjiaba-Shanghai transmission system, which was commissioned by State Grid Corporation of China (SGCC) in June 2010. The HVDC link is the most powerful and longest transmission of its kind to be implemented anywhere in the world; and at the time of commissioning, transmitted 6,400 MW of power over a distance of nearly 2,000 kilometres. This is longer than would be needed to link MENA and Europe. Siemens Energy has equipped the sending converter station Fulong for this link with ten DC converter transformers, including five rated at 800 kV.

The second HVDC project which is also for SGCC with cooperation from ABB, is a new HVDC link of 3,000 MW over 920 kilometres from Hulunbeir, in Inner Mongolia, to Shenyang in the province of Liaoning in the North-Eastern part of China in 2010. Another project scheduled for 2014 commissioning – is the construction of an ±800 kV North-East UHVDC link from the North-Eastern and Eastern region of India to the city of Agra across a distance of 1,728 kilometres.

Another project of this type is the Rio Madeira HVDC system a HVDC link of 2,375 kilometres (1,476 mi).

== Studies about DESERTEC ==
=== DLR studies ===
The DESERTEC Concept was developed by an international network of politicians, academics and economists, called TREC. The research institutes for renewable sources of the governments of Morocco (CDER), Algeria (NEAL), Libya (CSES), Egypt (NREA), Jordan (NERC) and Yemen (Universities of Sana'a and Aden) as well as the German Aerospace Center (DLR) made significant contributions towards the development of the DESERTEC Concept. The basic studies relating to DESERTEC were led by DLR scientist Dr. Franz Trieb working for the Institute for Technical Thermodynamics at the DLR. The three studies were funded by the German Federal Ministry for the Environment, Nature Conservation, and Nuclear Safety (BMU). The studies, conducted between 2004 and 2007, evaluated the following as shown in the table below;

Study	Description	Duration	Evaluation	Results
MED-CSP	study on concentrated solar power (CSP) for the Mediterranean Basin	2004–2005	evaluate the potential for renewable energy in the Middle East and North Africa (MENA), and availability of resources and demand for energy in the region	
TRANS-CSP	study on trans-Mediterranean interconnection and infrastructure	2004–2006	evaluate the potential for an integrated electric power transmission grid connecting the three regions – Europe, the Middle East, and North Africa; and the assessment of solar energy imports to Europe	
AQUA-CSP	study on CSP for the desalination of sea water	2004–2007	evaluate the anticipated water and power needs through 2050 in Europe, the Middle East, and North Africa; and the possibility to generate fresh water along with the electricity generation by the CSP	

The studies concluded that the extremely high solar radiation in the deserts of North Africa and the Middle East outweighs the 10–15% transmission losses between the desert regions and Europe. This means that solar thermal power plants in the desert regions are more economical than the same kinds of plants in southern Europe. The German Aerospace Center has calculated that if solar thermal power plants were to be constructed in large numbers in the coming years, the estimated cost of electricity would come down from 0.09 to 0.22 euro/kWh to about 0.04–0.05 euro/kWh.

The Sahara Desert was chosen as an ideal location for solar farms as it is exposed to bright sunshine nearly all the time, roughly between 80% and 97% of the daylight hours in the best cases. This is the sunniest year-round area on the planet. In the world's largest hot desert, there is an extremely vast area, covering almost the whole desert, that receives more than 3,600 h of yearly sunshine. There is also a large area in excess of 4,000 h of sunshine annually. The highest solar radiation received on the planet is in the Sahara Desert, under the Tropic of Cancer. This results from a general, strong lack of cloud cover year-round and a geographical position under the tropics.

The annual average insolation, which represents the total amount of solar radiation energy received on a given area and on a giver period, is about 2,500 kWh/(m^{2} year) over the region and this number can soar up to almost 3,000 kWh/(m^{2} year) in the best cases. The weather features of the Sahara Desert, especially the insolation, have a pronounced nature. The annual electricity production reaches 1,300,000 TWh at maximum in this sun-drenched area if the whole desert is covered in solar panels. The desert is also extremely vast covering about some 9,000,000 km^{2} (3,474,920 sq mi), being almost as large as China or the United States and is sparsely populated, making it possible to set up large solar farms without a negative impact on inhabitants of the region, too. Lastly, sand deserts can provide silicon, a raw material that is essential in the production of solar panels.

The great African desert is relatively cloud-free all year long but it's important to note the harsh, desert climate also has some negative features such as extreme heat and sometimes dust or sand-laden winds which frequently blow over the desert and can even result in severe duststorms or sandstorms. Both phenomenons reduce the solar electricity productivity and the efficiency of the solar panels.

=== Desert Power 2050 ===
Dii announced it would introduce a roll-out-plan in late 2012 which included concrete recommendations on how to enable investments in renewable energy and interconnected power grids. Dii claims to work with all key stakeholders from the international scientific and business communities as well as policy-makers and civil society to enable two or three concrete reference projects to demonstrate the feasibility of the long-term vision. Dii developed a strategic framework for a fully integrated and decarbonized power system based on renewable energies for the entire North Africa, Middle East, and Europe (EUMENA) region in 2050. Therefore, Dii researched from the viewpoint of technology and geography what is the optimal mix of renewable energies to provide the EUMENA region with sustainable energy. In July 2012 Dii presented the first part of its study "Desert Power 2050 – Perspectives on a Sustainable Power System for EUMENA.

Key Findings

Desert Power 2050 demonstrates that the abundance of sun and wind in the EUMENA region will enable the creation of a joint power network that will entail more than 90 percent renewables. According to the study, such a joint power network involving North Africa, the Middle East, and Europe (EUMENA) offers clear benefits to all involved. The nations of the Middle East and North Africa (MENA) could meet their expanding needs for power with renewable energy, while developing an export industry from their excess power which could reach an annual volume worth more than 60 billion euros, according to the study results. By importing up to 20 percent of its power from the deserts, Europe could save up to 30 euros for each megawatt-hour of desert power.

The north and south would become the powerhouses of this joint network, supported by wind and hydropower in Scandinavia, as well as wind and solar energy in the MENA region. Supply and demand would complement one other – both regionally and seasonally – according to the findings of Desert Power 2050. With its constant supply of wind and solar energy throughout the year, the MENA region can cover Europe's energy needs without the latter having to build costly excess capacities. A further benefit of the power network is the enhanced security of supply to all nations concerned. A renewables-based network would lead to mutual reliance among the countries involved, complemented by inexpensive imports from the south and the north.

Methodology

Desert Power 2050 presents the full perspective of the EUMENA region, which includes, for instance, the growing consumption of power in the MENA states. The power requirements of the MENA states are likely to more than quadruple by 2050, totalling more than 3000 terawatt hours. Unlike in Europe, the population will also grow considerably by the middle of the century, thus heightening the demand for new jobs. Analysing the design of a power system built to include more than 90% renewables 40 years into the future is necessarily subject to major uncertainties on a range of assumptions. To address these uncertainties Dii analysed so-called sensitivities, or perspectives, to show how the results react to changed parameters. Dii has analysed a total of 18 perspectives on the EUMENA power supply in 2050. They cover a wide range of major impact factors on the attractiveness of power system integration. The main message of the study: grid integration across the Mediterranean is valuable under all foreseeable circumstances.

Second Phase

Desert energy could be a stimulus for growth and make an important contribution when it comes to coping with the social and economic challenges in North Africa and the Middle East. Dii announced that a second phase of Desert Power 2050, Getting Started, will examine this topic in greater depth in the next few months, with discussions including political, scientific and industrial stakeholders. The objective is to formulate recommendations for the regulatory steps required in the years to come.

=== Other studies ===
More energy falls on the world's deserts in six hours than the world consumes in a year, and the Saharan desert is virtually uninhabited and is close to Europe. Supporters say that the project will keep Europe "at the forefront of the fight against climate change and help North African and European economies to grow within greenhouse gas emission limits". DESERTEC officials say the project could one day deliver 15 percent of Europe's electricity and a considerable part of MENA's electricity demand. According to the DESERTEC Foundation, the project has strong job creation potential and could improve the stability in the region. According to the report by Wuppertal Institute for Climate, Environment and Energy and the Club of Rome, the project could create 240,000 German jobs and generate €2 trillion worth of electricity by 2050.

== Projects ==
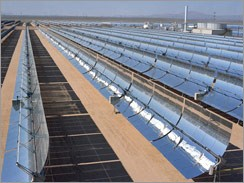
Arrays of parabolic troughs

The Sahara Desert covers huge parts of Algeria, Chad, Egypt, Libya, Mali, Mauritania, Morocco, Niger, Western Sahara, Sudan and Tunisia. It is one of three distinct physiographic provinces of the African massive physiographic division.

The first solar and wind power projects in North Africa have already begun. Algeria initiated a unique project in 2011 dealing with Hybrid power generation which combines a 25 MW concentrating solar power array in conjunction with a 130 MW combined cycle gas turbine plant Hassi R'Mel integrated solar combined cycle power station.

Other countries like Morocco have set up ambitious plans on the implementation of renewable energy. The Ouarzazate solar power station in Morocco for example, with the capacity of 500 MW, will be one of the largest concentrated solar plants in the world.

In 2011, the DESERTEC Foundation started to evaluate projects that could serve as models for the implementation of DESERTEC according to its sustainability criteria. The first of these is the TuNur solar power plant in Tunisia that is planned to have 2 GW of capacity. Creating up to 20,000 direct and indirect local jobs, its plants include dry-cooling systems that reduce water usage by up to 90%. Construction is planned to begin in 2014, and export power to Italy by 2016. A video on YouTube explains this project.

Talks with the Moroccan government had been successful and the Dii confirmed their first reference project would be in Morocco. As a partner in a beginning partnership between Europe and MENA Morocco is especially well-suited since a grid connection from Morocco via Gibraltar to Spain already exists. Also the Moroccan government enacted a program to support renewable energies. In June 2011, Dii signed a Memorandum of Understanding with the Moroccan Agency for Solar Energy (MASEN). MASEN will act as a project developer and will be responsible for all important project steps in Morocco. Dii will promote the project and its financing in the European Union in Brussels as well as in national governments. This reference project, with a total capacity of 500 MW, will be a combination of concentrated solar power plants (400 MW) and photovoltaics (100 MW). The first available power from the joint Dii/MASEN project could be fed into the Moroccan and Spanish grids between 2014 and 2016, depending on the selected technology and market conditions. Based on the current estimate the total costs are €2 billion.

In April 2010, Dii emphasised that the power plant won't be installed in the region of Western Sahara which is administered by Morocco. An official spokesperson of Dii made the following confirmation: "Our reference projects will not be located in the region. When looking for project sites, the DII will also take political, ecological or cultural issues into consideration. This procedure is in line with the funding policies of international development banks."

In Tunisia, STEG Énergies Renouvelables, a subsidiary of the Tunisian state utility company STEG, and Dii are currently working on a pre-feasibility study. The study focuses on substantial solar and wind energy projects in Tunisia. Research will address the technical and regulatory conditions for the supply of energy in local networks for the export of power to neighbouring countries as well as Europe. Besides financing of the project will be analysed.

Algeria, which offers excellent conditions for renewable energy, is considered as a potential location for a further reference project. In December 2011, the Algerian energy supplier Sonelgaz and Dii signed a Memorandum of Understanding on their future collaboration in the presence of EU Energy Commissioner Günther Oettinger and the Algerian Minister for Energy and Mining Youcef Yousfi. The focus of this cooperation will be the strengthening and the exchange of technical expertise, joint efforts in market development and the progress of renewable energy in Algeria as well as in foreign countries.

Since the Euro-Mediterranean projects, Medgrid and DESERTEC are both attempting to generate solar energy from deserts and complement each other, a MoU was signed on 24 November 2011 between Medgrid and Dii to study, design and promote an interconnected electrical grid linking both projects. The plan is to build five interconnections at a cost of around 5 billion euros ($6.7 billion), including between Tunisia and Italy. The activities of Dii and Medgrid are covered by the Mediterranean Solar Plan (MSP), a political initiative within the framework of the Union for the Mediterranean (UfM).

In March 2012 Dii, Medgrid, Friends of the supergrid and Renewables Grid Initiative signed a joint declaration to support the effective and complete integration, in a single electricity market, of renewable energy from both large-scale and decentralised sources, which shall not be played out against each other in Europe and in its neighbouring regions.

== See also ==
- Medgrid
- European super grid
- Intermittent energy source
- List of HVDC projects
- North Sea Offshore Grid
- Renewable energy in Morocco
- Relative cost of electricity generated by different sources
- Solar energy in Israel
- Solel
- SuperSmart Grid
- Wind power in Morocco
- SunCable Australia - Singapore
