= National Interest Electric Transmission Corridor =

Power lines designated by the US DOE as needing expansion

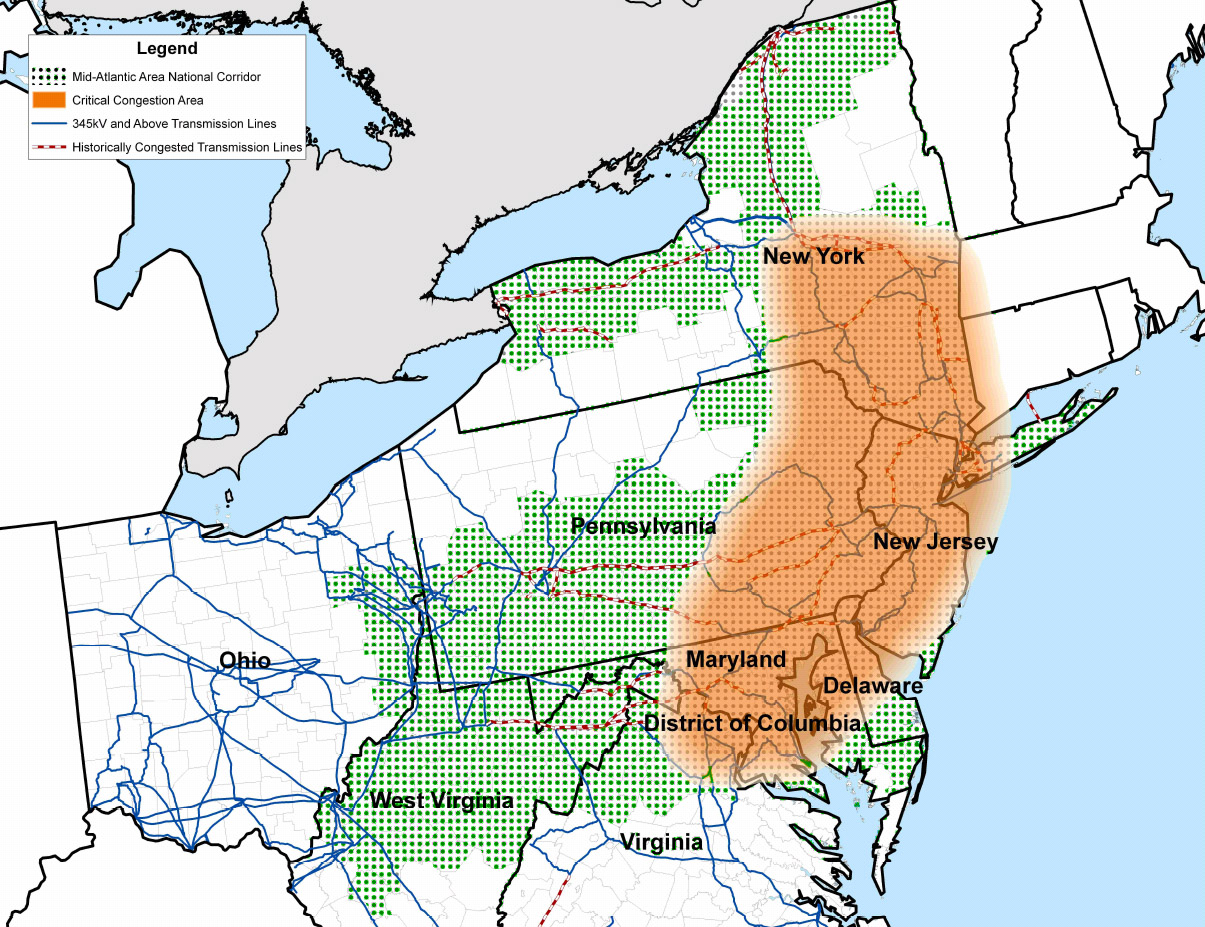
NIETC corridor designated for the Mid-Atlantic Area by the United States Department of Energy in 2007

A National Interest Electric Transmission Corridor (NIETC) corridor is a geographic region designated by the United States Department of Energy where electricity transmission limitations are adversely affecting American citizens. The Energy Policy Act of 2005 granted the Federal Energy Regulatory Commission (FERC) the authority to create these regions to increase transmission capacity within a short timeframe. If state and local governments fail to issue permits to increase transmission capacity in these areas, FERC can issue federal permits empowering project directors to use eminent domain to purchase property needed to complete projects.

== Background ==
In the United States, electricity generation is growing four times faster than transmission, and energy sources that would make the U.S. more energy independent cannot be built because there is no transmission capacity to carry the power to consumers. Because United States energy independence is a national priority, this problem has attracted considerable federal attention.

Historically, local governments have exercised authority over the electricity grid and have little incentive to take action that would benefit other states, but not their own. States with cheap electricity have a disincentive to make interstate commerce in electricity easier, since other states will be able to compete for local energy and drive up rates. Further, vocal local constituencies can block or slow permitting by pointing to visual impact, environmental, and perceived health concerns.

Large transmission upgrades require the coordination of multiple states, a multitude of interlocking permits, and a significant portion of the 500 companies that own the grid. From a policy perspective, the control of the grid is balkanized, and the former Energy Secretary Bill Richardson refers to it as a "third world grid". To address the U.S. national security interest in significantly growing transmission capacity, the Energy Policy Act of 2005 gave the Department of Energy the authority to approve transmission if states refuse to act. However, soon after using its power to designate two national corridors, fourteen senators signed a letter stating the DOE was being too aggressive.

== Legislation ==
Recognizing the impacts of transmission congestion, the inter-state nature of transmission needs, and the need to provide avenues for the facilitation of transmission capacity development, the US Congress passed the Energy Policy Act of 2005 which added Section 216 to the Federal Power Act (FPA; New Deal era legislation) which directs the US Department of Energy (DOE) to conduct a transmission congestion study every three years. Based on the results of these studies, the Secretary of Energy may designate "any geographic area experiencing electric energy transmission capacity constraints or congestion that adversely affects customers as a national interest electric transmission corridor". Designation of a NIETC emphasizes that the DOE considers the congestion problem in question to be of a national concern and enables FERC to approve the siting of transmission projects within the corridor.

== 2006 National Electric Transmission Congestion Study ==
The first study conducted by the Department of Energy was completed in 2006. The study developed and compiled metrics of electricity transmission performance related to the magnitude and impact of congestion (e.g. the number of hours per year where the transmission constraint is loaded to its maximum safe operating level, etc.). Based on this data, the DOE identified three categories of congested areas which have higher levels of transmission congestion for the Eastern Interconnection and the Western Interconnection (ERCOT is excluded from these studies as the system is not under the purview of federal authority; no interstate commerce). The study classified areas of concern into three categories: Critical Congestion Areas, Congestion Areas of Concern, and Conditional Congestion Areas.

A Critical Congestion Area is an area which is "critically important to remedy existing or growing congestion problems because the current and/or projected effects of the congestion are severe." Congestion Areas of Concern are areas where a "large-scale congestion problem exists or may be emerging, but more information and analysis appear to be needed to determine the magnitude of the problem and the likely relevance of transmission expansion and other solutions." Conditional Congestion Areas are areas where there is "some transmission congestion at present, but significant congestions would result if large amounts of new generation resources were to be developed without simultaneous development of associated transmission capacity."

As a result of this study, the DOE moved forward with consideration of designating the two areas identified as Critical Congestion Areas (The Atlantic coastal area from metropolitan New York Southward through Northern Virginia; and in Southern California) as National Corridors in order to facilitate relief of transmission congestion. In order to begin the process, the DOE posed three initial questions to key transmission system stakeholders:

1. Would designation of one or more National Corridors in relation to these areas be more appropriate and in the public interest?
2. How and where should the DOE establish the geographic boundaries for a National Corridor?
3. To the extent a commenter is focusing on a proposed transmission project, how would the costs of the facility be allocated?

Based on these discussions, the Secretary of Energy declared two National Corridors: the Mid-Atlantic and Southwest Area National Interest Electric Transmission Corridors in October 2007.

== Corridor designations of 2007 ==
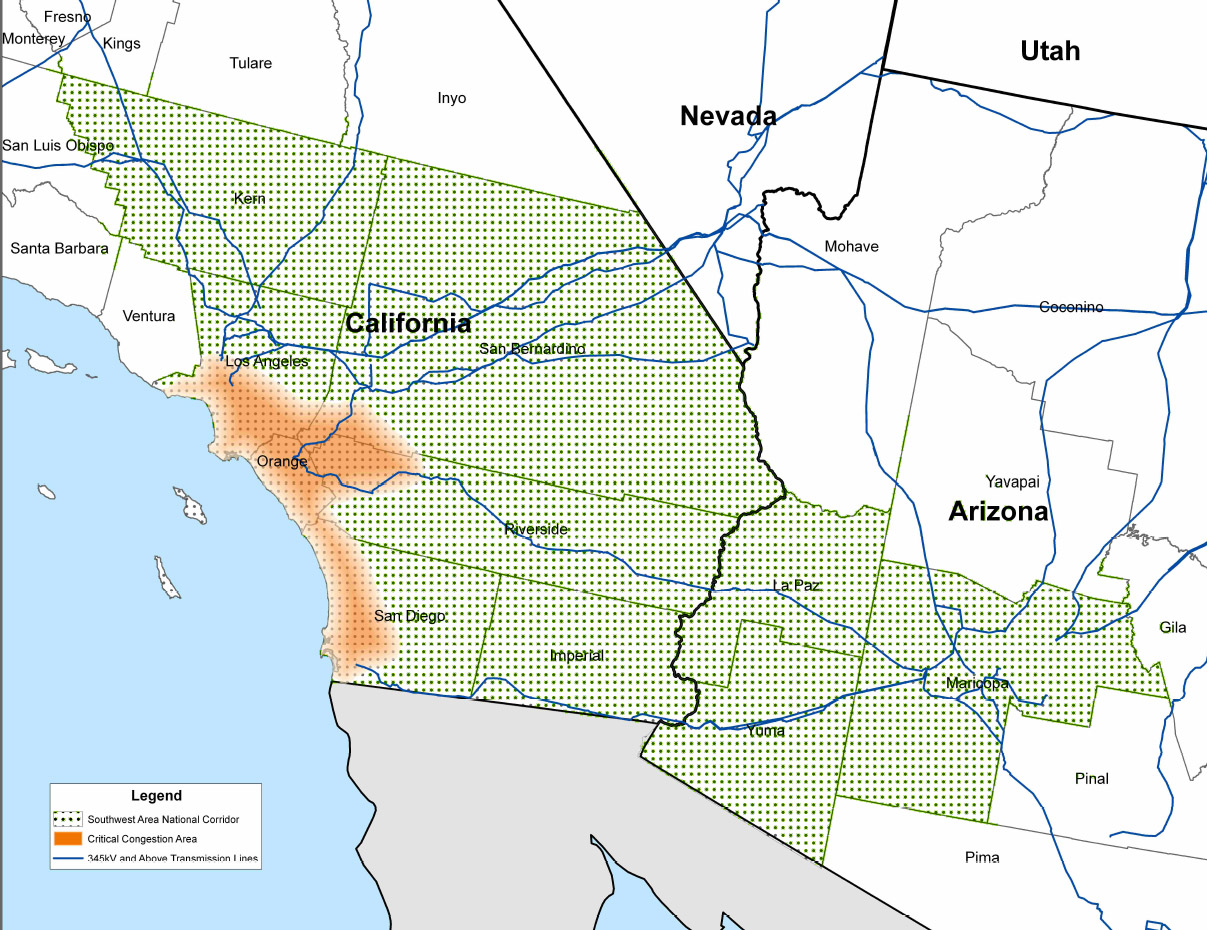
NIETC corridor designated for the Southwest Area in 2007

In 2007, the DOE designated two corridors, the Mid-Atlantic Area national corridor, and the Southwest Area corridor. Using a source-and-sink approach, the DOE determined areas of significant transmission network congestion and electricity demand (sink), then examined likely areas of nearby generation (source). The possible paths between these sources and sinks defined the highest priority regions where transmission lines need to be built. In designating an NIETC corridor, the DOE does not specify preferred routes for projects, just the general region where such projects are eligible for federal permits. Further, DOE did not exclude federal or state lands from the regions since right of eminent domain by a FERC permit would not apply to them. Although Congress did not specify that national corridors expire, the Secretary of Energy set a limit of 12 years for the Southwest and Mid-Atlantic corridors, subject to revision at any time after giving notice and opportunity for public comment.

== Project approval ==
Approval of routes for specific projects will continue to be the responsibility of state authorities. However, FERC may issue a permit if a proposed project will significantly reduce a transmission constraint in the national corridor. (As of 2024 this principle, known as 'backstop siting authority', continues to hold, according to FERC Order No. 1977.) According to the DOE, the NIETC permit process should not disrupt the existing activities of state authorities, and FERC will investigate allegations that an applicant has acted in bad faith in state proceedings.

When a specific route is chosen for a project, FERC will conduct an environmental impact statement (EIS) prior to groundbreaking. The DOE did not conduct an EIS for either NIETC region in the 2007 decision, arguing that the designation does not authorize any specific projects or routes.

== Piedmont Environmental Council v. FERC, 2009 ==
In 2009, the US Fourth Circuit Court of Appeals considered FERC's interpretation of Section 216 of the FPA as a result of the designations of the Mid-Atlantic and Southwest National Interest Transmission Corridors. Here, the court reversed FERC's interpretation of FPA that reserves the right to overturn a state's denial of a permit application under the FPA's granted authority to assume permitting jurisdiction if a state has "withheld approval [of a permit application] for more than 1 year." The court found that the interpretation of the authority to approve denied applications for permits was incorrect and limited FERC's authority to grant approval of applications withheld for more than one year.

The result of this decision is that the FERC's power under the FPA with respect to permitting approvals was limited to a specific category of applications. Provided that a state permitting agency clearly denies a permit application within one year of the petition, FERC has no authority to grant those permits. Further, this interpretation was largely reaffirmed by subsequent proposals for energy policy legislation in Congress which excluded clear expansion of FERC's authority over denied permit applications.

== 2009 National Electric Transmission Congestion Study ==
In 2009, DOE conducted its second transmission congestion study. The data gathering and analysis process differed significantly from the 2006 study in that rather than relying on internal sources of data gathering and analysis, existing research and studies were leveraged from key stakeholders to develop the study.

Additionally, in accordance with the Recovery Act of 2009, DOE specifically reviewed those transmission constraints which had, or were projected to have, a negative impact on the development of renewable energy capacity development. As part of this requirement, DOE added two subcategories of Conditional Congestion Areas: Type I - An area with large availability of renewable resources which could be developed using existing technology if sufficient transmission were available; and Type II - An area with renewable resource potential that is not yet technologically mature but shows promise due to its quality, size and location.

DOE concluded that both the Mid-Atlantic and Southwestern Critical Congestion Areas had not shown significant positive development and recommended that National Corridors were still valid designations. Additionally, the 2009 report re-affirmed that the San Francisco, Seattle-Portland, and the Phoenix-Tucson Congestion Areas of Concern were still valid classifications. The New England Congestion Area of Concern classification from the 2006 report was rescinded however, as the region had i) shown significant development in utility and small scale capacity, ii) developed aggressive demand response systems which were effective in making timely load reductions, and iii) shown success with energy efficiency programs across the affected area.

== California Wilderness Coalition v. US Department of Energy, 2011 ==
In 2011, the 2006 Transmission Congestion Study and the 2007 designations of the Mid-Atlantic and Southwest National Interest Electric Transmission Corridors were vacated by the US Ninth Circuit Court of Appeals in California Wilderness Coalition v. US DOE. The decision to vacate the 2006 Transmission Congestion Study was made on the basis that DOE did not adequately consult with the states in the conduct of the study as required under the FPA making specific mention that "there was the likelihood that proper consultation would have produced different results."

The Ninth Circuit Court also vacated the NIETC designations made in 2007 based on DOE's failure to adequately consider the environmental impacts of such designations as required under the National Environmental Policy Act (NEPA).

Congress later attempted to supersede this decision and revive Section 216 authority with the Infrastructure Investment and Jobs Act in 2021.

== 2012 National Electric Transmission Congestion Study ==
Largely as a result of California Wilderness Coalition v. US DOE, the 2012 National Electric Transmission Study has been delayed. Over the course of 2012, DOE conducted research and hosted three internet based "webinars" with key transmission stakeholders in the electricity industry to discuss DOE's preliminary findings. Following these webinars, DOE released a preliminary summary of its findings in August, 2012, which are summarized below:

- The study will not draw broad conclusions about large geographic areas (i.e. DOE will not identify or update Critical Congestion Areas, Congestion Areas of Concern, or Conditional Congestion Areas);
- The study will rely entirely on public data and analyses – no DOE modeling;
- The study will not analyze the economics of alternative methods to address specific congestion problems;
- The economic slow-down that began in 2008 has resulted in a reduced rate of electricity demand growth and concomitantly, less of an increase in transmission congestion;
- Low natural gas prices have resulted in lower congestion due to i) increased generation from gas-fired generators which are often located nearer to demand centers, and ii) lower fuel costs translating to lower congestion costs;
- State Renewable Portfolio Standards (RPS) are resulting in increased congestion along specific transmission corridors;
- Transmission development since 2009 has helped to reduce congestion;
- The North-East region has experienced a decline in congestion costs relative to total electricity costs.
- The data collected from the West and Mid-West regions generally aligns with the North-East region.
- The DOE identified a strong need for the improvement of transmission data and is working with key stakeholders to define and collect consistent data regarding transmission development, utilization, reliability, and operating practices.

The DOE did, however, release a report titled: Transmission Constraints and Congestion in the Western and Eastern Interconnections in January 2014 which examines many of the same topics that the official National Electric Congestion Study will eventually address.

In February 2014, the DOE submitted a consultation draft of the 2012 National Electric Transmission Congestion Study to the chairs of the State Public Utility Commissions and the heads of the regional reliability entities, requesting written comments no later than April, 2014.

== 2023 National Transmission Needs Study ==
On October 30, 2023, the DOE announced the results of its next congestion study that, for the first time in its history, included anticipation of future grid transmission needs; the Infrastructure Investment and Jobs Act had explicitly required this inclusion, which necessitated its renaming to the National Transmission Needs Study. The study found a decline in infrastructure investments since 2015 and consistently high prices in the Rust Belt and California since 2018, and projected a 20 to 128 percent increase in transmission would be needed within regions, while interregional transmission would need to increase by 25 to 412 percent, and found the most potential was in better connecting Texas to the Southwest region, the Mississippi Delta and Midwest regions to the Great Plains region, and New York to New England.

In December 2023 the DOE fulfilled the IIJA's requirement that the designation process for National Interest Electric Transmission Corridors be revised. In December 2024, the DOE announced that the first three new NIETCs under the IIJA's process would move closer toward full eligibility for TFP funds under the Act's new process, a corridor on the bed of Lake Erie between Ontario and Pennsylvania, a connector between Colorado, New Mexico and Oklahoma, and a connector between the Dakotas. Notably, the sponsor of the Kansas-Indiana Grain Belt Express requested that it be taken off the eligibility list because they had likely secured enough funding to do so.

In October 2024, the DOE released its first ever National Transmission Planning Study to follow up on the Needs Study, forecasting a needed national transmission capacity increase of 2.4 to 3.5 times the 2020 level by 2050 to keep costs low and facilitate the energy transition, with estimated cost savings ranging from $270 billion to $490 billion.

== NIETCs under the second Trump administration ==
In August 2026, Secretary of Energy Chris Wright announced that the DOE would not move forward with the three designated NIETCs in Lake Erie, the Dakotas and the Oklahoma Panhandle, citing the Biden administration's "climate alarmist agenda" affecting grid reliability. The previous month, the Trump administration had released the 2026 draft National Transmission Needs Study, which noted the continued necessity of new interregional transmission.

== See also ==
- Electricity transmission corridor
- Electric power transmission
- Super grid
- Unified Smart Grid
