= North Seas Energy Cooperation =

EU energy collaboration

- Logo
- Administrative center: Brussels, Belgium
- Members: Belgium; Denmark; France; Germany; Ireland; Luxembourg; Netherlands; Norway; Sweden; European Commission

Establishment
  - NSCOGI proposed: 2008
  - NSEC Established: 2016
- Website https://energy.ec.europa.eu/topics/infrastructure/high-level-groups/north-seas-energy-cooperation_en

The North Seas Energy Cooperation (NSEC), officially the Political Declaration on energy cooperation between the North Seas Countries, is a collaboration between EU member-states and Norway to create an integrated offshore energy grid which links wind farms and other renewable energy sources across the northern seas of Europe. First proposed as the North Seas Countries Offshore Grid Initiative (NSCOGI), it is one of several European super grid schemes.

Electricity would be transmitted via high-voltage direct current cables, allowing it to be sold and exchanged in all involved countries. It would also make it easier to optimise energy production, and make the system overall less susceptible to the climate; Norway's hydroelectric power plants could act as a "giant battery", storing the power produced and releasing it at peak times, or when wind strength is low. Several high-voltage direct current interconnectors such as the North Sea Link between Norway and Britain (operational since 2021) have been seen as integral parts of the project.

== History ==
The North Sea Offshore Grid was proposed by the European Commission in the Second Strategic Energy Review, published in November 2008. The initiative was identified as one of the six priority energy infrastructure actions of the European Union. According to the European Commission, the North Sea Offshore Grid should become one of the building blocks of a future European super grid.

The political declaration of the North Seas Countries Offshore Grid Initiative was signed on 7 December 2009 at the European Union Energy Council. The declaration was signed by the EU members Germany, United Kingdom, France, Denmark, Sweden, the Netherlands, Belgium, Ireland and Luxembourg, as well as Norway.

The European Commission planned to publish a "Blueprint for a North Sea Grid" in 2010.

== Member states ==
The member states of the North Seas Energy Cooperation are; Belgium, Denmark, France, Germany, the Republic of Ireland, Luxembourg, Netherlands, Norway and Sweden, together with the European Commission.

The United Kingdom was previously a member but left following Brexit on 31 January 2020. The UK agreed to reengage with NSEC at the first summit of the European Political Community in October 2022, and formally signed an agreement for cooperation with NSEC in December 2022.

== Significance ==
Minister for Communications, Energy and Natural Resources for the Government of Ireland, Eamon Ryan, said of the initiative:

This project is another example of European vision and ambition in energy policy. It is a huge step towards meeting our common renewable energy goals and in guaranteeing a low carbon future.

Irish wind farms will be able to connect directly to Europe, not only securing our energy supply but allowing us to sell the electricity produced on a wider market.

It makes economic, as well as environmental sense. By working together, all of the countries involved will reap the benefits.

— Minister Eamon Ryan, speaking at the Energy Council.

== Studies ==
A techno-economic study into the North Sea Offshore Grid, has been set up within the European Union's Intelligent Energy Europe programme, to consider the technical, economic, policy and regulatory aspects of the possible grid, focused on the North Sea and Baltic region.

Belgium is building a national modular offshore grid, connecting several wind farms for common transfer of power onto land at Zeebrugge, near the Nemo Link to England.

== Support ==
Friends of the Supergrid, a group of companies and organisations interested in promoting the concept and influencing the development of a super grid within Europe, has taken an interest in the North Sea Grid proposals. The organisation has proposed that Phase I of the supergrid should integrate the UK's North Sea renewables with interconnections to Germany and Norway.

== Targets ==
In 2022, NSEC members agreed on a target of 260 GW of offshore wind energy by 2050, a major part of the total EU target of 300 GW of offshore wind energy capacity by 2050. Interim targets of 76 GW by 2030 and 193 GW by 2040 were also set. The UK plans to have 50 GW capacity of offshore wind by 2030.

== See also ==
- DESERTEC
- ISLES project (Irish-Scottish Links on Energy Study) – potential complementary offshore grid
- List of HVDC projects
- List of offshore wind farms in the North Sea
- North Sea Wind Power Hub
- POWER cluster
- Renewable Electricity and the Grid
- SuperSmart Grid
- Synchronous grid of Continental Europe
- Wide area synchronous grid
- NorthSeal
