= SuperSmart Grid =

Hypothetical electricity network connecting Europe and Africa

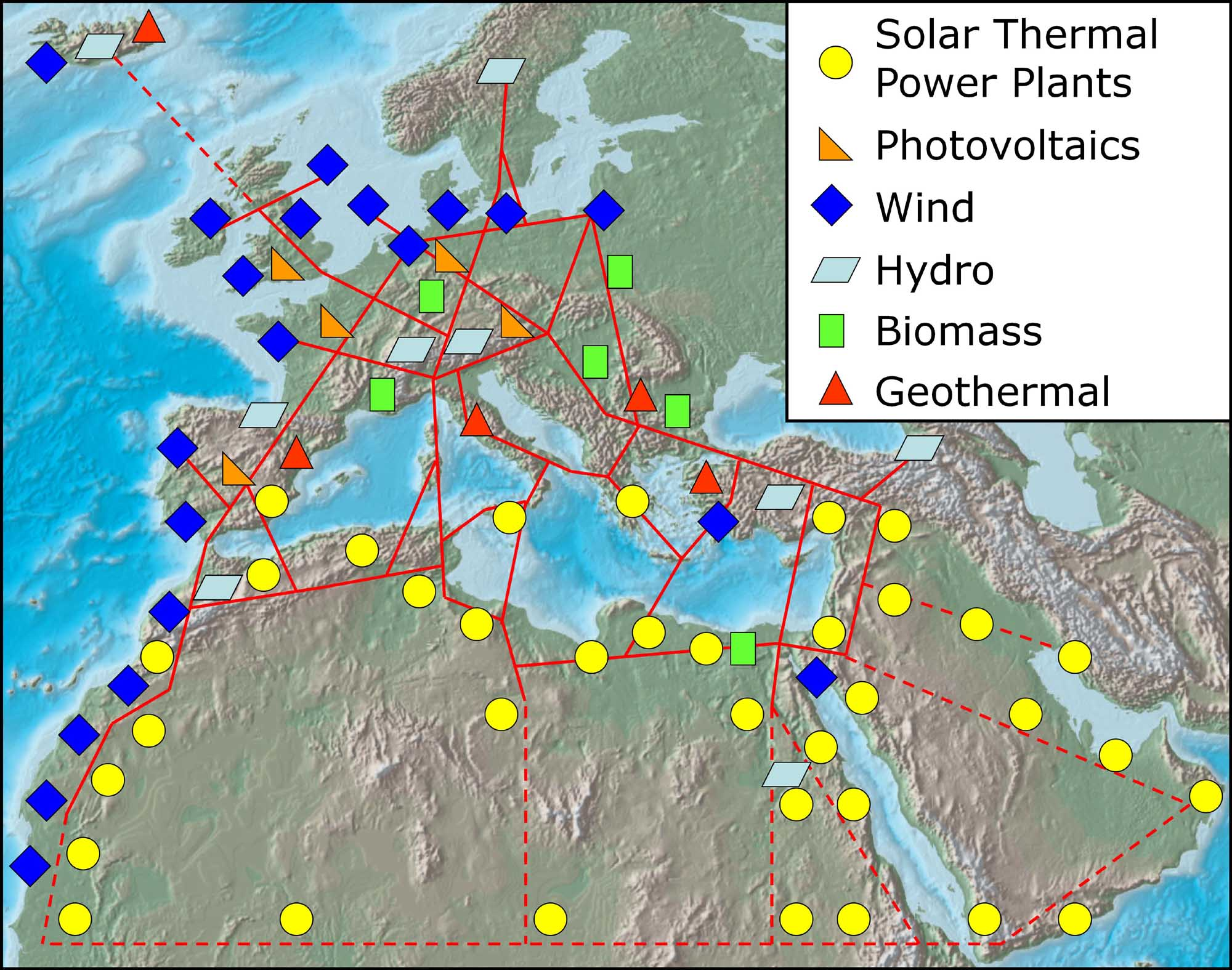
A conceptual plan of a European super grid linking renewable energy projects like DESERTEC & Medgrid across North Africa, the Middle East and Europe and could serve as the backbone for the hypothetical supersmart grid.

The SuperSmart Grid (SSG) is a hypothetical wide area electricity network connecting Europe with northern Africa, the Middle East, and the IPS/UPS system of CIS countries. The system would unify super grid and smart grid capabilities into a comprehensive network. There are no planned locations for infrastructure or schedule explicitly for the SSG; rather, the name is used to discuss the economic and technological feasibility of such a network and ways in which it might gain political support.

The ambitious upgrade and unification of current transmission and/or distribution grids finds support among advocates of large scale utilization of alternative energy, and as well as advocates of enhanced energy security for Europe. The SSG proposal was initiated by the European Climate Forum and at the Potsdam Institute for Climate Impact Research by Antonella Battaglini and colleagues.

== History ==
The concept of a "super grid" is not new –the term itself was used to describe the emerging unification of the Great Britain grid in the 60s. Europe has been unifying its grids since the 1950s and its largest unified grid is the synchronous grid of Continental Europe serving 27 countries. There are studies and ongoing discussions regarding creation of a synchronous grid spanning 13 time zones which would result from the unification the UCTE grid with that of the IPS/UPS Interconnection serving Russia, Belarus and other countries of the former Soviet Union. Such mega systems are experiencing scaling problems as a result of network complexity, transmission congestion, and the need for rapid diagnostic, coordination and control systems. Advocates of schemes such as the SuperSmart Grid claim that such a major technological upgrade is necessary to assure the practical operation and promised benefits of such transcontinental mega grids.

== Concept ==
The concept of a wide-area "super grid" with centralized control and the concept of small-scale, local and decentralized smart grid are two approaches that are often perceived as being mutually exclusive alternatives. The SSG aims at reconciling the two approaches and considers them complementary and necessary to realize a transition towards a fully decarbonized electricity system. The super grid features would deliver inexpensive, high capacity, low loss transmission, interconnecting producers and consumers of electricity across vast distances. Smart grid capabilities use the local grid's transmission and distribution network to coordinate distributed generation, grid storage and consumption into a cluster that appears to the super grid as a virtual power plant.

The name "SuperSmart Grid" was invented by Antonella Battaglini and used the first time in the position paper for the energy conference in Lund in 2007. In the context of the SuperSmart Grid, advocates use the term "super grid" to refer to a network super imposed on top of local grid networks.

== Implementation practicalities ==
The SSG relies on existing technology. The SuperSmart Grid would employ high voltage direct current (HVDC) cables in its first-generation implementation to integrate the European electricity market and possibly connect it to neighboring regions, such as North Africa, and their vast renewable energy resources, such as those that could be unlocked by the DESERTEC & Medgrid project. The SuperSmart Grid would operate 'on top' of the local high voltage AC (HVAC) grids. Existing AC grids would still transmit electricity over shorter domestic distances, but be upgraded to smart grids.

Dr Gregor Czisch of Kassel University, has constructed and optimized a model indicating that an entirely renewable electric supply system is possible at 2008 electricity prices.

== Initial work ==
An initial project proposed in 2006 by Irish wind farm developer Airtricity (Formerly Eirtricity) and Swiss engineering firm ABB would provide a chain of undersea cable connections extending from the Baltic Sea southward to Spain and servicing areas between the endpoints. Proponents of the project claimed that this western corridor could be in service as early as 2015. The first segments would provide two 5000 megawatt links connecting a new 10,000 megawatt group of wind parks in the North Sea with consumers in the UK and continental Europe.

== See also ==
- Wide area synchronous grid
- Smart grid
- European super grid, Synchronous grid of Continental Europe
- Unified Smart Grid
- Super grid
- Pickens plan
- V2G
- North Sea Offshore Grid
- DESERTEC
- Medgrid
