= SuperGrid (hydrogen) =

In lossless power transmission, a supergrid with hydrogen is an idea for combining very long distance electric power transmission with liquid hydrogen distribution, to achieve superconductivity in the cables. The hydrogen is both a distributed fuel and a cryogenic coolant for the power lines, rendering them superconducting. The concept's advocates describe it as being in a "visionary" stage, for which no new scientific breakthrough is required but which requires major technological innovations before it could progress to a practical system. A system for the United States is projected to require "several decades" before it could be fully implemented.

One proposed design for a superconducting cable includes a superconducting bipolar DC line operating at ±50 kV, and 50 kA, transmitting about 2.5 GW for several hundred kilometers at zero resistance and nearly no line loss. High-voltage direct current (HVDC) lines have the capability of transmitting similar wattages, for example a 5 gigawatt HVDC system is being constructed along the southern provinces of China without the use of superconducting cables.

In the United States, a Continental SuperGrid 4,000 kilometers long might carry 40,000 to 80,000 MW in a tunnel shared with long-distance high speed maglev trains, which at low pressure could allow cross continental journeys of one hour. The liquid hydrogen pipeline would both store and deliver hydrogen.

1.5% of the energy transmitted on the British AC Supergrid is lost (transformer, heating and capacitive losses). Of this, a little under two-thirds (or 1% on the British supergrid), represents "DC" (resistive) heating type losses. With superconductive power lines, the capacitive and transformer losses (in the unlikely event the transmission lines were still overhead AC lines) would remain the same. In addition, overhead lines do not lend themselves at all well physically to the incorporation of cryogenic hydrogen piping, due to the likely weight of the transmission medium and the considerable brittleness of supercooled materials. It would probably be necessary for a supercooled hydrogen-carrying transmission line to be subterranean, and this in turn means that for such a cable, if it were of any distance (e.g. over 60 km), the power would have to be converted to DC and transmitted as such, since otherwise the capacitive losses would be too high. In this case, the power electronic losses in the AC/DC converter substations would negate part or all of the power savings from the superconductive line itself.

Even before comprehensive continental and (in the case of the proposed European Super Grid) intercontinental backbones of electrical transmission may be realized, such cables could be used to efficiently interconnect regional power grids of conventional design.

== See also ==
- Superconducting cables
- High voltage direct current
