= Medgrid =

MEDGRID Project
- Duration: July 2010 – till date
- Goal: "To develop an Euro-Mediterranean electricity network of 20 GW generating capacity, primarily from solar and wind farms stretching across the MENA region; with 5 GW being devoted for exports to Europe"
- Organization: Medgrid
- Established: July 2010
- Estimated completion: 2020—2025
- Estimated budget: €5 billion (US$6.6 billion)
- Key people: André Merlin, CEO of Medgrid
- Shareholders and partners: See consortium

Medgrid project, created at the end of 2010 in Paris, is a large industrial project planned in North Africa, which aims to promote and develop a Euro-Mediterranean electricity network that would provide North Africa & Europe with inexpensive renewable electricity, mostly from solar. The goal is to install 20 gigawatts (GW) of generating capacity, with 5 GW being devoted for exports to Europe.

The Medgrid project was envisioned by a consortium of twenty plus utilities, grid operators, equipment makers, financing institutions and investors, mostly European.

On 24 Nov 2011, a MoU was signed between Medgrid and Desertec Industry Initiative (Dii) to study, design and promote an interconnected electrical grid with the 400 billion euro ($536 billion) renewable energy 'Desertec' project in North Africa. The medgrid together with Desertec would serve as the backbone of the 'European Supergrid' and the benefits of investing in HVDC technology are being assessed to reach the final goal – the 'SuperSmart Grid (SSG)'.

== History ==
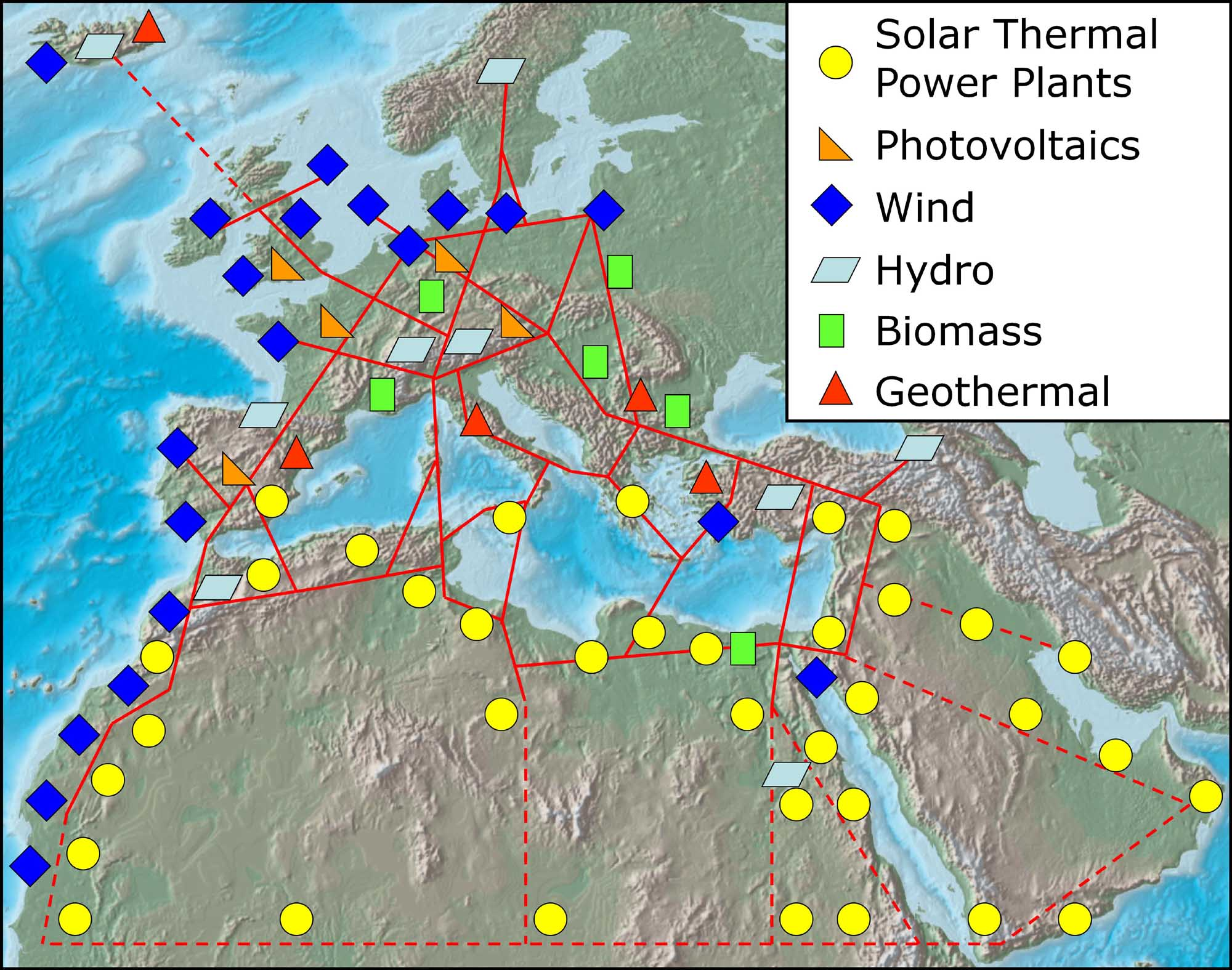
A conceptual plan of a European super grid linking renewable energy projects like DESERTEC & Medgrid across North Africa, the Middle East and Europe and could serve as the backbone for the hypothetical supersmart grid.

Union for the Mediterranean member countries potentially benefiting by the Mediterranean Solar Plan Members of the European Union Other members Observer members

=== Background ===
As per the statement made by Dr Gerhard Knies, German physicist and founder of the Trans-Mediterranean Renewable Energy Cooperation (TREC) network of researchers - "The world’s deserts collect more energy from the sun in six hours than mankind consumes in an entire year". It illustrates the idea behind the ambitious project - Medgrid which will exploit solar energy from desert areas.

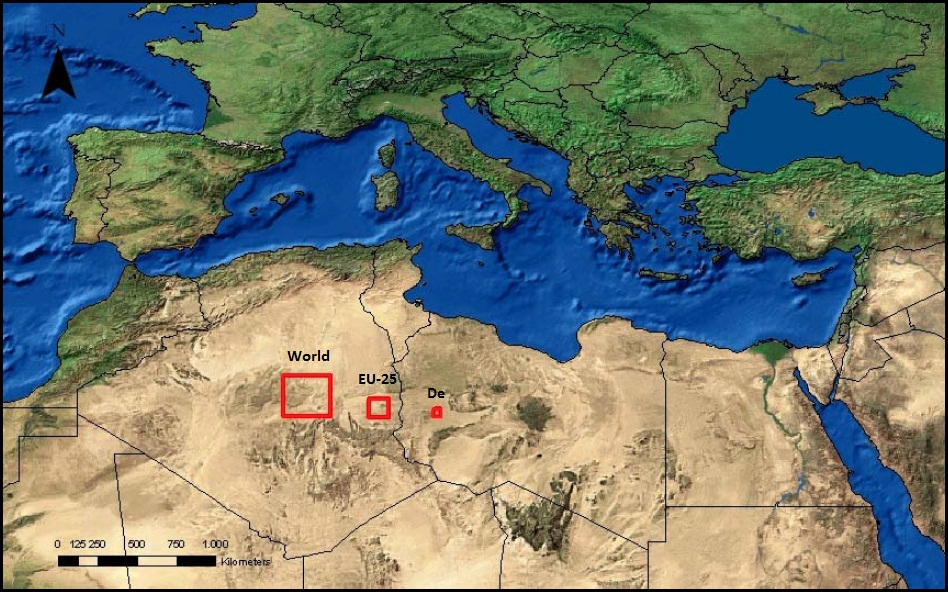
The red squares represent the area that would be enough for solar power plants to produce a quantity of electricity consumed by the world in 2005, in Europe (EU-25) and Germany. (Data provided by the German Aerospace Centre (DLR), 2005)

The Sahara desert was chosen as an ideal location for solar farms as they enjoy strong direct sunlight for much of the year (3,000 to 4,000 hours of sunlight per year). In addition, the deserts are sparsely populated, making it possible to set up large solar farms. Lastly, sand deserts can provide silicon, a raw material that is essential in the production of solar panels.

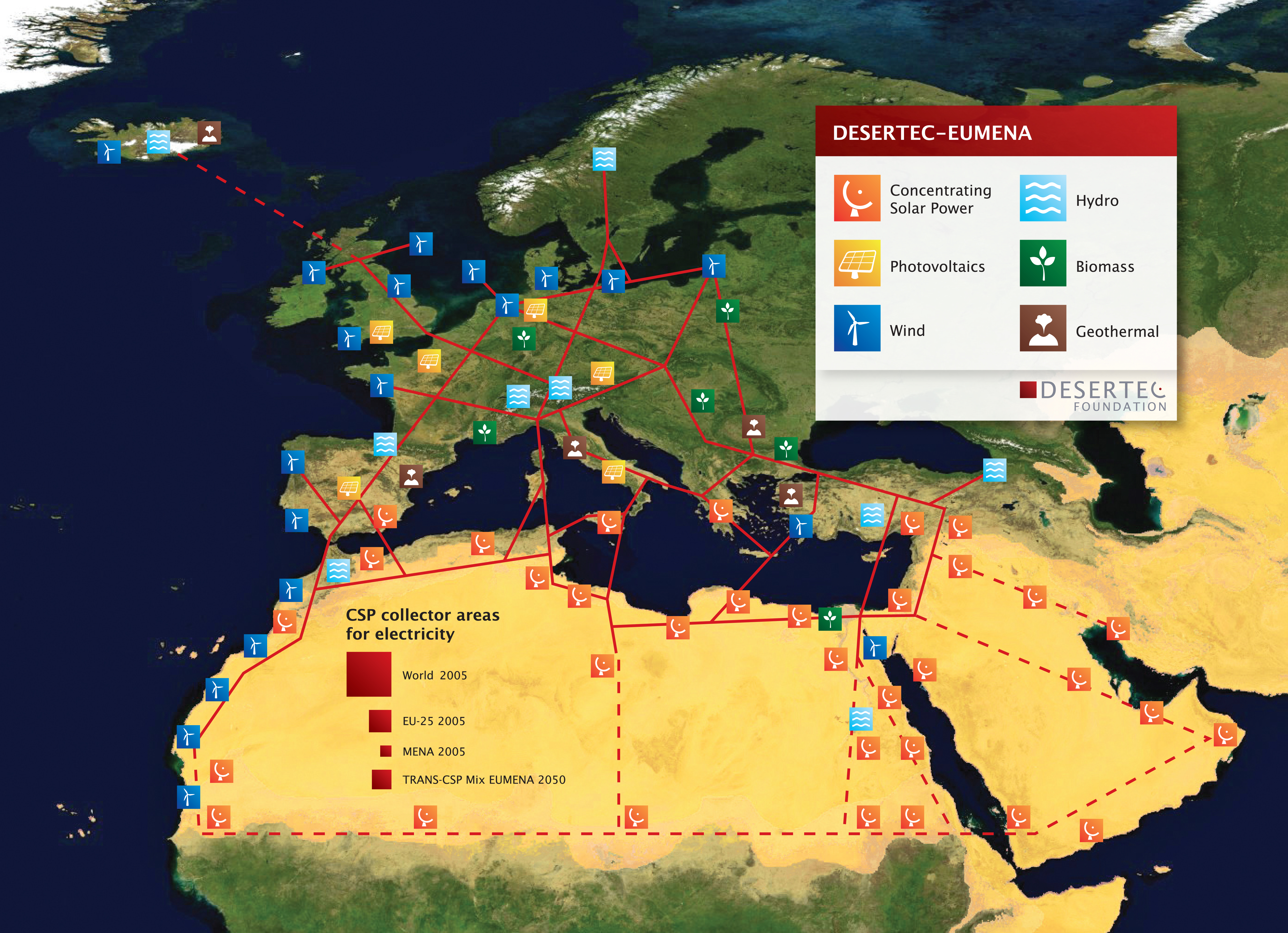
Schematic plan of the European Supergrid

=== Inception of Medgrid consortium (July 2010 - present) ===
Existing links Under construction Proposed See also the List of HVDC project in Europe, which would eventually be part of European Supergrid

Complementing a similar Saharan desert based renewable energy project - DESERTEC, the industrial project Transgreen was launched in Paris in July 2010 as a French initiative within the framework of the Union for the Mediterranean (UfM). A consortium of twenty-plus, mostly European, utilities, grid operators, equipment makers, financing institutions and investors envisioned the company named Medgrid in December 2010. The aim was to promote and develop a Euro-Mediterranean electricity network that would provide North Africa & Europe with inexpensive renewable electricity, mostly from solar. The goal is to install 20 GW of generating capacity, with 5 GW being devoted for exports to Europe. France and Morocco will launch the first experiment to transport solar power from the south to the north of the Mediterranean.

Since the Euro-Mediterranean projects, Medgrid and Desertec are both attempting to generate solar energy from deserts and complement each other, a MoU was signed on 24 Nov 2011 between Medgrid and Desertec Industry Initiative (Dii) to study, design and promote an interconnected electrical grid with the 400 billion euro ($536 billion) renewable energy "Desertec" project in North Africa. The plan is to build five interconnections at a cost of around 5 billion euros ($6.7 billion), including between Tunisia and Italy. The activities of Dii and Medgrid are covered by the Mediterranean Solar Plan (MSP), a political initiative within the framework of the Union for the Mediterranean (UfM).

In March 2012 Dii, Medgrid, Friends of the supergrid and Renewables Grid Initiative signed a joint declaration to support the effective and complete integration, in a single electricity market, of renewable energy from both large-scale and decentralised sources, which shall not be played out against each other in Europe and in its neighbouring regions.

The medgrid together with Desertec would serve as the backbone of the 'European Supergrid' and the benefits of investing in HVDC technology are being assessed to reach the final goal – the 'SuperSmart Grid (SSG)'.

== Consortium ==
The consortium of twenty plus utilities, grid operators, equipment makers, financing institutions and investors include,

- Abengoa SA (Spain)
- Alstom SA (France)
- Areva SA (France)
- Atos Worldgrid (France)
- cdc infrastructure (France)
- EDF SA (France)
- GDF Suez SA (France)
- NEMO (Italy)
- Nexans (France)
- L'Office National de l'Électricité (ONE) (Morocco)
- Pan Med Trading and Investment (Jordan)
- Prysmian (Italy)
- Red Electrica Corp. SA (Spain)
- REN (Portugal)
- RTE (France)
- Siemens AG (Germany)
- Soitec (France)
- Taqa Arabia (Egypt)
- Terna SA (Italy)
- Tunur (United Kingdom)
- Walid Elias Establishment (Syria)

The consortium is led by André Merlin, CEO of Medgrid.

== See also ==
- Supersmart Grid
- Desertec
- European super grid
