= NorthSeal =

Joint security platform by countries near the North Sea

- Region served: North Sea
- Members: Belgium; Denmark; Germany; Netherlands; Norway; United Kingdom
- Lead country: Belgium
- Establishment: Discussed: North Sea Summit in Belgium 24 April 2023; Proposed: Joint Declaration signed 9 April 2024; Operational launch: 15 January 2025

NorthSeal is a security platform established following the "Joint Declaration on cooperation regarding protection of infrastructure in the North Sea". The objective of NorthSeal is to monitor suspicious maritime activity, enable rapid information exchange, and coordinate joint responses among the six North Sea Countries: Belgium, the Netherlands, Germany, Norway, the United Kingdom, and Denmark. France, which also has a short stretch of coastline with access to the North Sea, has yet to join the collaboration. The purpose of the platform is to promote cooperation and address threats such as sabotage, espionage and other security challenges related to critical infrastructure in the region. It is designed to include NATO as an optional partner, allowing it to participate in the information exchange and have access to data shared by the other countries. NorthSeal became operational on 15 January 2025, following a brief testing phase.

== History ==
On 24 April 2023, at the North Sea Summit in Belgium, national security advisers from nine different countries met to discuss strengthening cooperation and improving the security of critical maritime infrastructure in the North Sea. This later led to the "Joint Declaration to protect and enhance the resilience of critical maritime infrastructure in the North Sea". The declaration was formally signed on 9 April 2024 by several countries bordering the North Sea: Belgium, the Netherlands, Germany, Norway, the United Kingdom, and Denmark. The declaration encourages the signing countries to share best practices for improving security and resilience, information-sharing, and to work more closely with entities such as the EU and NATO. To achieve this, the declaration outlines ambitions to establish 'a joint working group with competent national authorities' that works toward 'effective information sharing between the participants'. The initiative also aspires to create a new central contact point to facilitate effective communication, information sharing, and a reporting system among North Sea countries. Belgium has since assumed a leading role and invested €1 million to support the initial development of the NorthSeal platform, which is designed to address these needs.

== Background ==
The North Sea contains a wide range of critical maritime infrastructures, including shipping, offshore oil and gas fields, and, as well as a variety of renewable energy installations. These infrastructures have become important to Europe's energy security and economic prosperity. Due to the privatization that occurred in the region from the 1980s, many maritime infrastructures are now privately owned and operated. As a consequence, the North Sea has become a highly congested region, involving stakeholders from both public and private sectors across multiple nationalities. Given the dense concentration of infrastructure in the North Sea, the infrastructure of the countries in the region has become deeply interconnected. However, in recent years, incidents such as the damage to the Nord Stream and Balticconnector pipelines in 2022 and 2023 have underscored the vulnerability of such critical maritime infrastructures to new and emerging threats. These include actions by state adversaries, often described as hybrid threats or grey zone activities. The interconnected and transnational nature of critical maritime infrastructure in the region, has highlighted the need for regional cooperation related to security and protection. This has led to a renewed political focus on the protection of critical maritime infrastructure, including more recently within the North Sea countries.

== Significance and Future Outlook ==
Paul Van Tigchelt, former Minister of Justice and the North Sea in the Government of Belgium, stated regarding the initiative:

Protecting our critical infrastructure in the North Sea is vital for our energy supply, internet, communication and safety. Sitting idle is not an option. We are working together much more intensively on an international scale. With this launch, Belgium is demonstrating its pioneering role and commitment to a safe North Sea for future generations. The next step is to further expand the Safety Pact to include other countries around the North Sea and to increase our military presence in the North Sea. I hope that the next administration will work on this.

— Minister Paul Van Tigchelt, in a press release.

This statement indicate the possibility of more North Sea countries being included in the safety agreement in the near future. Moreover, it aligns with the Joint Declaration to protect and enhance the resilience of critical maritime infrastructure in the North Sea, which encourages and welcome new participants of other North Sea countries to enter the declaration.

== See also ==
- North Sea
- North Sea Energy Cooperation
- North Sea Region
