= European super grid =

Hypothetical super grid

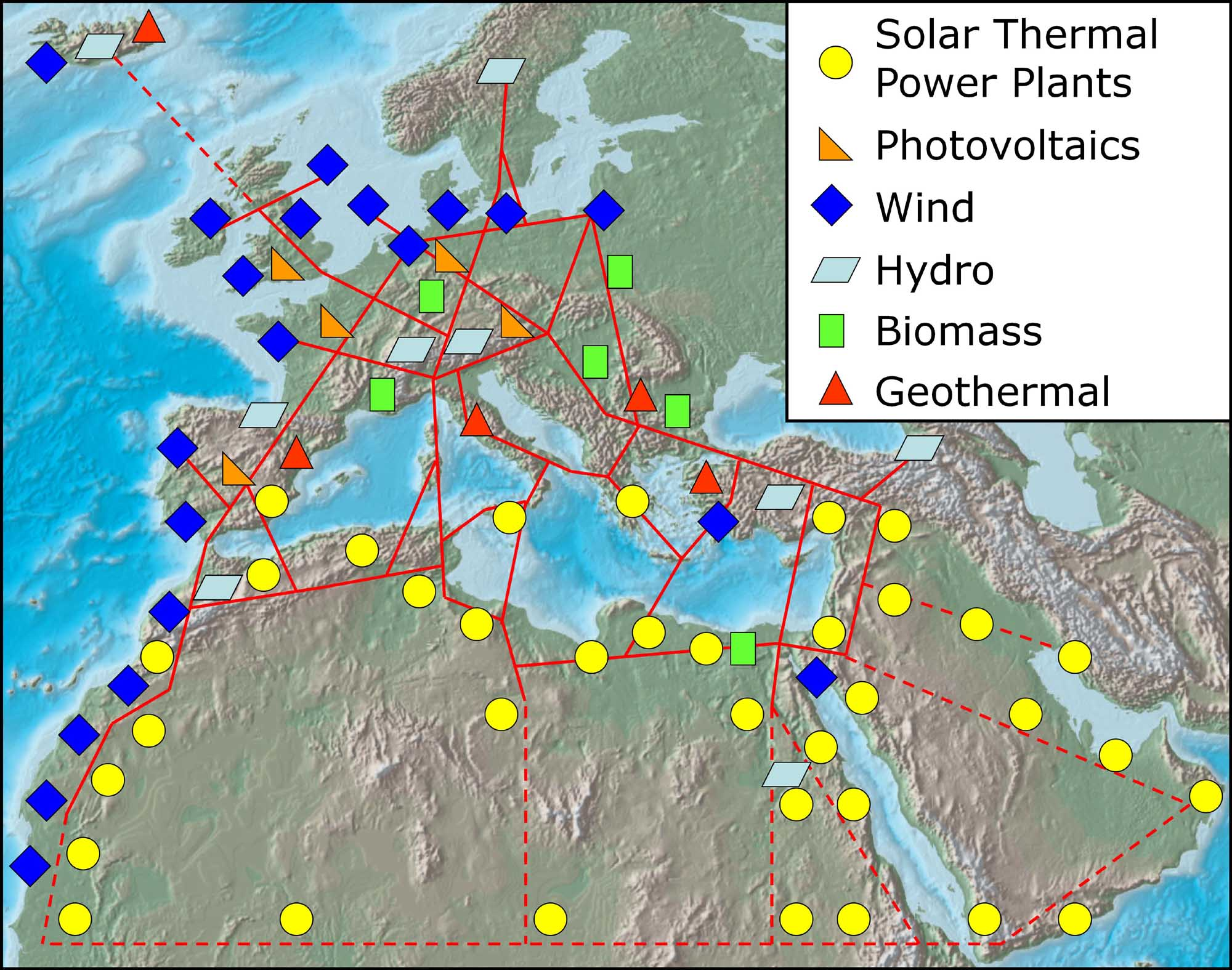
A conceptual plan of a European super grid linking renewable energy projects such DESERTEC & Medgrid across North Africa, the Middle East and Europe and could serve as the backbone for the hypothetical supersmart grid.

Existing links Under construction Proposed See also the List of HVDC projects in Europe, which would eventually be part of European Supergrid.

The European super grid is a hypothetical super grid which ultimately would interconnect the various European countries and the regions around Europe's borders—including North Africa, Kazakhstan, and Turkey—with a high-voltage direct current (HVDC) power grid.

It is envisaged that a European super grid would:

- lower the cost of power in all participating countries by allowing the entire region to share the most efficient power plants;
- pool load variability and power station unreliability, reducing the margin of inefficient spinning reserve and standby that have to be supplied;
- allow for wider use of renewable energy, particularly wind energy, from the concept that "it is always windy somewhere" –in particular it tends to be windy in the summer in North Africa, and windy in the winter in Europe;
- allow wide sharing of the total European hydro power resource, which is about 6 weeks of full load European output;
- decrease Europe's dependence on imported fuels.

A recent study from the University College Dublin (UCD) Energy Institute indicates that implementing a pan-European 'supergrid' could lead to a 32% reduction in energy costs across the continent.

== Proposed schemes ==
The most comprehensive study has been carried out by Dr Gregor Czisch, of Kassel University. His study optimised a vast grid covering North Africa, Eastern Europe, Norway, and Iceland. His study ran a number of scenarios, wind, concentrating solar power (CSP), nuclear etc., and the optimisation showed that all European power could largely come from wind energy, with relatively low amounts of combustion plant needed during universal low wind periods. Furthermore, the study showed that no new storage would be required; existing hydro would be sufficient. The total cost, including for new combustion plant, fuelled by biomass, the cost of the interconnections, the inefficiency of starting and stopping the combustion plant, all indicated a power price at the same as Germany was paying in 2005.

A number of other specific schemes have been proposed to create super grids of varying extent within Europe. These include:

- Baltic Energy Market Interconnection Plan involving Denmark, Estonia, Finland, Germany, Latvia, Lithuania, Poland, Sweden and Norway.
- Europagrid, proposed by Europagrid Limited to link various European countries including the United Kingdom, Ireland, Netherlands, Belgium, Germany and Norway.
- North Sea Offshore Grid, an active proposal by the European Commission, first proposed in November 2008 as a building block towards a Europe-wide super grid involving Germany, the United Kingdom, France, Denmark, Sweden, the Netherlands, Belgium, Ireland and Luxembourg.
- Low Grid, proposed by Greenpeace to link the countries of Central Europe, particularly Germany, the Netherlands, Belgium and France.
- High Grid, proposed by Greenpeace to link Europe and North Africa, emphasising the installation of solar power in the South of Europe.
- ISLES, an active proposal, at feasibility stage as of September 2011, to link Scotland, Northern Ireland and Ireland with off-shore renewable energy generation.
- The All Islands Approach, based on cooperation between the countries of the British Isles.
- EU PowerNet, a supergrid to be owned by a cooperative company, owned and governed by the 'national Transmission system operators' (TSOs) of participating European states. The concept recognises the national sovereignty of those states while realising 'direct interconnectors' between all TSO-networks instead of only between neighbors.

== Related schemes ==
- DESERTEC, a concept based upon the idea of building concentrating solar power (CSP) stations in North Africa and the Middle East and exporting the power to Europe by HVDC lines.
- Medgrid, a project planned in North Africa, which aims to promote and develop a Euro-Mediterranean electricity network that would provide North Africa & Europe with inexpensive renewable electricity, mostly solar. The goal is to install 20 GW of generating capacity, with 5 GW being devoted to exports for Europe.

On 24 November 2011, a memorandum of understanding (MoU) was signed between Medgrid and Desertec Industry Initiative (Dii) to study, design and promote an interconnected electrical grid with Desertec & Medgrid projects. Medgrid together with Desertec would serve as the backbone of a European super grid; the benefits of investing in HVDC technology are being assessed to reach the final goal of establishing the SuperSmart Grid.

== Evaluations ==
A report by Pöyry stated that a super grid would only partially reduce the problems from intermittent renewable energy production. While it found that spreading renewables across Europe produced a smoothing effect, large scale weather patterns would impact many European countries at similar times. This still results in large highs and lows of energy output. However this report does not consider the super grid covering the much larger area as the Czisch study, which would further smooth energy output to some extent.

== See also ==
- Intermittent energy source
- Relative cost of electricity generated by different sources
- SuperSmart Grid
- Synchronous grid of Continental Europe
- Wide area synchronous grid
