= Asian Super Grid =

Electrical power grid project

- Goal: "To interconnect electric power systems of Asian countries, enabling mutual benefits by exchanging abundant natural renewable energy resources, such as wind, solar and hydropower"
- Conceptualised: September 2011
- Key people: Masayoshi Son

The Asian Super Grid is a project to establish an electrical power transmission network, or super grid, connecting China, South Korea, Taiwan, Mongolia, Russia, Japan and India.

It will transmit electrical power from renewable sources from areas of the world that are best able to produce it to consumers in other parts of the world. The idea is dependent on development of an ultra-high voltage grid operating at more than 1,000 kilovolts AC and 800 kilovolts DC over thousands of kilometers. It envisions interconnecting grids across regions, nations, and even continents with a capacity of over 10 gigawatts.

The concept is the result of an idea by Masayoshi Son, founder and head of the telecom and Internet giant SoftBank Group. After the devastation of the Fukushima nuclear accident in the 2011 Tohoku earthquake, Son was so shocked by events that he established the Renewable Energy Institute soon afterwards to help develop and promote renewable energy.

A diverse and widely sourced mix of both renewable and non-renewable energy sources connected by super grid could reduce the region’s risk of power outages; as experienced after the 2011 Fukushima Daiichi Nuclear Disaster, and 2011 South Korea blackouts.

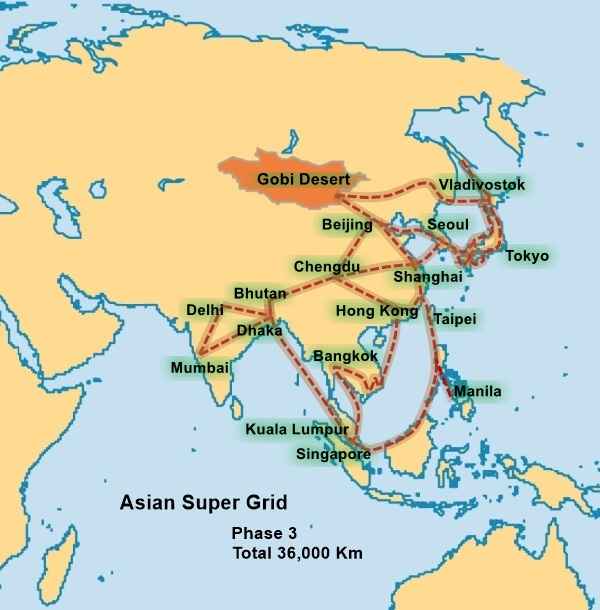
A conceptual plan of Asian Super Grid from 'Renewable Energy Institute'

== See also ==
- List of HVDC projects
- Super grid
