= Unified Smart Grid =

Proposed US-wide electricity transmission system

Unified National Smart Grid as well as Unified Solar is a proposal for a nationally interconnected grid relying on a backbone of electric power transmission lines linking the US' local grids that have been upgraded to smart grids. Europe's analogous project is sometimes referred to as the SuperSmart Grid.

== Technical features ==
High capacity transmission such as current technology 800 kV high voltage direct current lines would span the country, linking to local electric utilities and distantly located bulk power generation facilities. The national backbone would be intelligent in a manner similar to local smart grid clusters. As local electricity networks are upgraded to smart grids, interactions with the national backbone can become more coordinated. Examples given of the kinds of coordination are that hydropower from the northwest can be dispatched if wind is expected to temporarily subside in the Dakotas. Discretionary air conditioning in California can be turned on if strong winds are blowing in Texas.

Long distance interconnections are not new. The 1400 km Pacific DC Intertie between Los Angeles and the Pacific northwest was proposed in the 1930s and initiated by President John F. Kennedy in the 60s. The Pacific Intertie carries up to 3.1 GW on two 500 kV overhead lines. The 1200 km Quebec to New England HVDC line with 2 GW of capacity was constructed in the 1980s. A 5 GW 800 kV system was constructed along the southern provinces of China at a cost of €300 million in 2010.

The Unified Smart Grid proposal is more than a collection of point to point interconnections between regional systems with some communications intelligence. The topology conceptually has many smart grid access points that could form a virtual power generation cluster, a local electric utility system, or a grid energy storage facility.

== Advocacy ==
According to advocates, a national system would do for the US energy economy what Dwight Eisenhower's Interstate Highway System did for efficient distribution of products. According to scientists such as James E. Hansen, construction of such a national grid is essential to any strategy to combat global warming. According to energy independence advocates such as T. Boone Pickens, it is essential for the U.S. economy and its strategic energy interests.

The "Unified Smart Grid" is promoted by Alliance for Climate Protection (Repower America program) and Al Gore. Gore's cost estimate is $400 billion and would be recovered by transmission tariffs. The need for a national bulk transmission grid is detailed in T. Boone Pickens's energy independence plan.

== See also ==
- List of energy storage projects
- Pickens plan
- Smart grid
- SuperSmart Grid
- Super grid
- V2G
- Wide area synchronous grid
