= ISLES project =

Study on renewable energy potential off the coasts of western Scotland and Ireland

ISLES (Irish–Scottish Links on Energy Study) was a two phase project that ran from 2010–2015. Its purpose was to facilitate the development of offshore renewable resources, such as wind, wave and tidal energy, and renewable energy trade between Scotland, Republic of Ireland and Northern Ireland. It assessed the feasibility, and developed a conception, of creating an integrated offshore transmission network connecting renewable energy project sites located off the west coast of Scotland, north and east coasts of Northern Ireland, west coast of Ireland and in the Irish Sea with onshore grids. It was a joint project between the governments of Scotland, Ireland and Northern Ireland, funded primarily by the European Union's INTERREG IVA Programme. Funding from INTERREG was approximately €2 million and was managed by the Special EU Programmes Body . The project was also awarded Project of Common Interest status by the European Union.

ISLES

The first phase of the ISLES project was led by the Scottish Government and announced by Minister for Enterprise, Energy and Tourism of Scotland Jim Mather and Minister for Communications, Energy and Natural Resources of Ireland Eamon Ryan in Glasgow on 7 June 2008. The contract to undertake the feasibility study was awarded to a consortium led by RPS Group. Its final reports were delivered to the inter-governmental steering group in late-2011. The findings were disseminated at a conference in Glasgow on 23 November 2011. According to these findings, there are no technological barriers to ISLES and the project is feasible, although landfall points throughout the three jurisdictions have significant constraints due to environmental issues. It would cost about £1 million per each MW of installed capacity. It concluded that a second project was needed to achieve further progress toward implementation.

ISLES 2: Towards Implementation

Phase 2 of the project was announced by Mather's successor Fergus Ewing in 2013. Once again it was a partnership between project partners the Scottish Government, Department of Enterprise Trade and Investment in Northern Ireland, and the Department of Communications, Energy and Natural Resources in Ireland. Match funding was secured from the European Union's INTERREG IVA Programme overseen by the Special EU Programmes Body. A consortium of consultants worked together on three workstreams: a spatial plan and sustainability appraisal; a network regulation and market alignment study; and a business plan. A suite of reports was unveiled by Chris Stark at the All Energy Conference in Glasgow on 6 May 2015 and formally published on 18 September 2015.

== See also ==
- North Sea Offshore Grid
