= Pietro Lorefice =

Italian politician (born 1967)

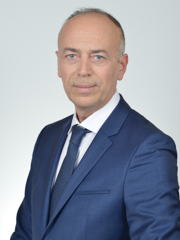
- Lorefice in 2018

Member of the Senate of the Republic
- Incumbent
- Assumed office 23 March 2018
- Constituency: Sicily – U05 (2018–2022); Sicily – P01 (2022–present)

Personal details
- Born: 18 July 1967 (age 58)
- Party: Five Star Movement

Pietro Lorefice (born 18 July 1967) is an Italian politician serving as a member of the Senate since 2018. He has served as secretary of the Senate since 2022.
