= Wide area synchronous grid =

Regional electrical grid

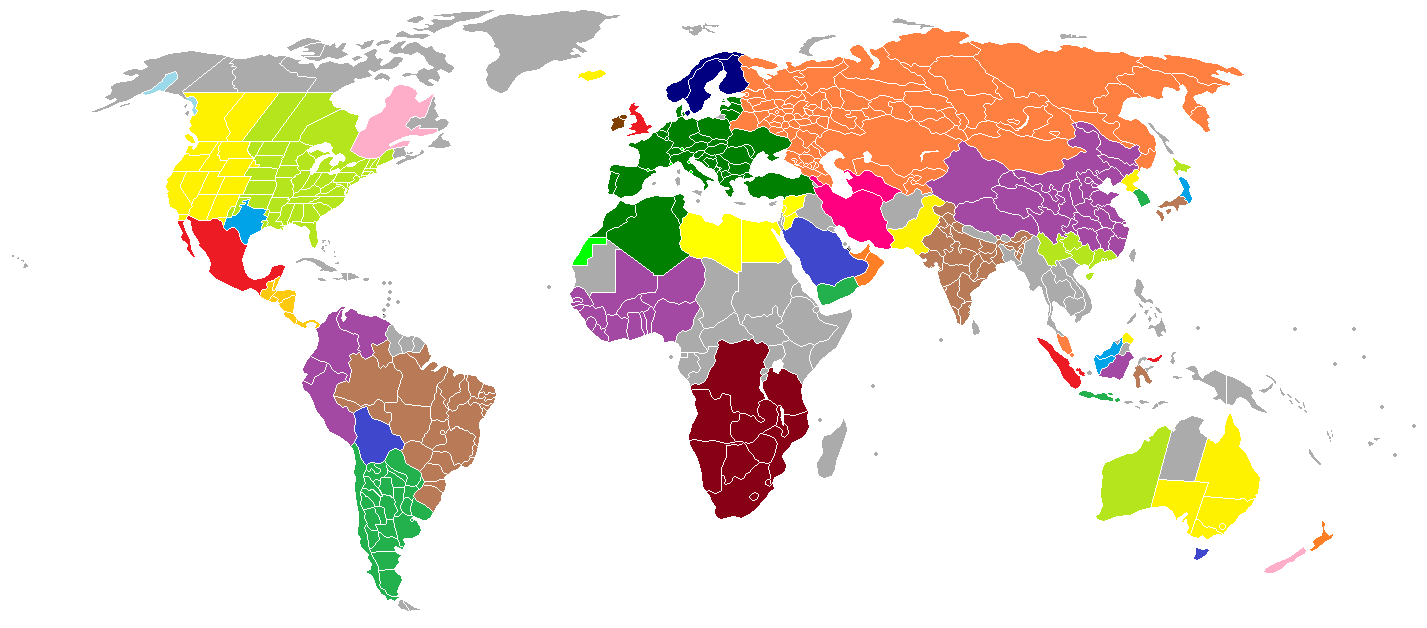
Major WASGs in Eurasia, Africa and Oceania, North and Central America

The two major and three minor interconnections of North America

The synchronous grids of Europe and North Africa

A wide area synchronous grid (also called an "interconnection" in North America) is a three-phase electric power grid that has regional scale or greater that operates at a synchronized utility frequency and is electrically tied together during normal system conditions. Also known as synchronous zones, the most powerful is the Northern Chinese State Grid with 1,700 gigawatts (GW) of generation capacity, while the widest region served is that of the IPS/UPS system serving most countries of the former Soviet Union. Synchronous grids with ample capacity facilitate electricity trading across wide areas. In the CESA system in 2008, over 350,000 megawatt hours were sold per day on the European Energy Exchange (EEX).

Neighbouring interconnections with the same frequency and standards can be synchronized and directly connected to form a larger interconnection, or they may share power without synchronization via high-voltage direct current power transmission lines (DC ties), solid-state transformers or variable-frequency transformers (VFTs), which permit a controlled flow of energy while also functionally isolating the independent AC frequencies of each side. Each of the interconnects in North America is synchronized at a nominal 60 Hz, while those of Europe run at 50 Hz.

The benefits of synchronous zones include pooling of generation, resulting in lower generation costs; pooling of load, resulting in significant equalizing effects; common provisioning of reserves, resulting in cheaper primary and secondary reserve power costs; opening of the market, resulting in possibility of long term contracts and short term power exchanges; and mutual assistance in the event of disturbances.

One disadvantage of a wide-area synchronous grid is that problems in one part can have repercussions across the whole grid.

== Properties ==
Wide area synchronous networks improve reliability and permit the pooling of resources. Also, they can level out the load, which reduces the required generating capacity, allow more environmentally-friendly power to be employed; allow more diverse power generation schemes and permit economies of scale.

Unusual for a national grid, different regions of Japan's electricity transmission network run at completely different frequencies.

Wide area synchronous networks cannot be formed if the two networks to be linked are running at different frequencies or have significantly different standards. For example, in Japan, for historical reasons, the northern part of the country operates on 50 Hz, but the southern part uses 60 Hz. That makes it impossible to form a single synchronous network, which was problematic when the Fukushima Daiichi plant melted down.

Also, even when the networks have compatible standards, failure modes can be problematic. Phase and current limitations can be reached, which can cause widespread outages. The issues are sometimes solved by adding HVDC links within the network to permit greater control during off-nominal events.

As was discovered in the 2000–2001 California electricity crisis, there can be strong incentives among some market traders to create deliberate congestion and poor management of generation capacity on an interconnection network to inflate prices. Increasing transmission capacity and expanding the market by uniting with neighbouring synchronous networks make such manipulations more difficult.

=== Frequency ===
In a synchronous grid, all the generators naturally lock together electrically and run at the same frequency, and stay very nearly in phase with each other. For rotating generators, a local governor regulates the driving torque and helps maintain a more or less constant speed as loading changes. Droop speed control ensures that multiple parallel generators share load changes in proportion to their rating. Generation and consumption must be balanced across the entire grid because energy is consumed as it is produced. Energy is stored in the immediate short term by the rotational kinetic energy of the generators.

Small deviations from the nominal system frequency are very important in regulating individual generators and assessing the equilibrium of the grid as a whole. When the grid is heavily loaded, the frequency slows, and governors adjust their generators so that more power is output (droop speed control). When the grid is lightly loaded the grid frequency runs above the nominal frequency, and this is taken as an indication by Automatic Generation Control systems across the network that generators should reduce their output.

In addition, there's often central control, which can change the parameters of the AGC systems over timescales of a minute or longer to further adjust the regional network flows and the operating frequency of the grid.

Where neighbouring grids, operating at different frequencies, need to be interconnected, a frequency converter is required. HVDC interconnectors, solid-state transformers or variable-frequency transformers links can connect two grids that operate at different frequencies or that are not maintaining synchronism.

=== Inertia ===
Inertia in a synchronous grid is stored energy that a grid has available which can provide extra power for up to a few seconds to maintain the grid frequency. Historically, this was provided only by the angular momentum of the generators, and gave the control circuits time to adjust their output to variations in loads, and sudden generator or distribution failures.

Inverters connected to HVDC usually have no inertia, but wind power can provide inertia, and solar and battery systems can provide synthetic inertia.

=== Short circuit current ===
In short circuit situations, it's important for a grid to be able to provide sufficient current to keep the voltage and frequency reasonably stable until circuit breakers can resolve the fault. Many traditional generator systems had wires which could be overloaded for very short periods without damage, but inverters are not as able to deliver multiple times their rated load. The short circuit ratio can be calculated for each point on the grid, and if it is found to be too low, for steps to be taken to increase it to be above 1, which is considered stable.

=== Timekeeping ===
For timekeeping purposes, over the course of a day the operating frequency will be varied so as to balance out deviations and to prevent line-operated clocks from gaining or losing significant time by ensuring there are 4.32 million cycles on 50 Hz systems, and 5.184 million cycles on 60 Hz systems each day.

This can, rarely, lead to problems. In 2018 Kosovo used more power than it generated due to a row with Serbia, leading to the phase in the whole synchronous grid of Continental Europe lagging behind what it should have been. The frequency dropped to 49.996 Hz. Over time, this caused synchronous electric clocks to become six minutes slow until the disagreement was resolved.

== Deployed networks ==
Name	Countries	Covers/Notes	Organization/Company	Generation capacity	Yearly generation	Year/Refs
Northern Chinese State Grid	China	Northern China	State Grid Corporation of China	1700 GW	5830 TWh	2020
Continental Europe Synchronous Area (CESA, formerly UCTE grid)	European Union (excluding Ireland, Sweden, Finland, Cyprus, Region Zealand and Capital Region of Denmark); Bosnia and Herzegovina Montenegro North Macedonia Kosovo Serbia Switzerland Morocco Algeria Tunisia Turkey Ukraine Moldova	35 countries in Europe, Asia and North Africa, serving 450 million	ENTSO-E	859 GW	2569 TWh	2017
National Grid (India)	India	Serving over 1.4 billion people	Power Grid Corporation of India	500 GW	1844 TWh	2025
Eastern Interconnection	United States Canada	Eastern US (except most of Texas) and eastern Canada (except Quebec and Newfoundland and Labrador)		610 GW	1380 TWh	2017
IPS/UPS	Russia (Excluding Kaliningrad and Sakhalin) Belarus Kazakhstan Kyrgyzstan Uzbekistan Tajikistan Georgia Azerbaijan Mongolia	8 countries of former Soviet Union and Mongolia, serving 210 million		337 GW	1285 TWh	2005
China Southern Power Grid	China	Southern China		320 GW	1051 TWh	2019
Western Interconnection	United States Canada Mexico	Western US, western Canada, and northern Baja California in Mexico		265 GW	883 TWh	2015
National Interconnected System (SIN)	Brazil	Electricity sector in Brazil		150 GW	410 TWh (2007)	2016
Synchronous grid of Northern Europe	Norway Sweden Finland Denmark	Nordic countries (Finland, Sweden-except Gotland, Norway and Eastern Denmark) serving 25 million people		93 GW	390 TWh	
National Grid (Great Britain)	United Kingdom	Great Britain's synchronous zone, serving 65 million	National Grid plc	83 GW (2018)	336 TWh	2017
Iran National Grid	Iran Armenia Turkmenistan	Iran and Armenia, serving 84 million people		82 GW		2019
Southern African Power Pool	Angola Botswana Democratic Republic of the Congo Eswatini Lesotho Mozambique Malawi Namibia South Africa Tanzania Zambia Zimbabwe	SAPP serves 9 out of 12 SADC countries and small regions of Angola, Malawi, and Tanzania		80.9 GW	289 TWh	2020
Texas Interconnection	United States	Most of Texas; serves 24 million customers	Electric Reliability Council of Texas (ERCOT)	78 GW	352 TWh (2016)	2018
National Electricity Market	Australia	Australia's States and Territories except for Western Australia and the Northern Territory (Tasmania is part of it but not synchronised)	National Electricity Market	50 GW	196 TWh	2018
Quebec Interconnection	Canada	Quebec	Hydro-Québec TransÉnergie	42 GW	184 TWh	
JAMALI (Java–Madura–Bali)	Indonesia	JAMALI System serves 7 provinces (West, East, and Central Java, Banten, Jakarta, Yogyakarta, and Bali), serving 49.4 million customers. (Part of ASEAN Power Grid project)	PLN	40.1 GW (2020)	163 TWh (2017)	2021
Argentine Interconnection System	Argentina	Argentina except Tierra del Fuego		39.7 GW	129 TWh	2019
National Electrical System	Chile	Main Chilean grid		31.7 GW	75.8 TWh	2022
Sumatera System	Indonesia	Sumatera System serves 8 provinces (North, West, South Sumatera, Aceh, Bengkulu, Lampung, Jambi, and Riau) and Bangka Island, serving 17 million customers. (Part of ASEAN Power Grid project)	PLN	14.7 GW (2020)	32.1 TWh (2016)	2022
Irish Grid	Ireland United Kingdom	Ireland and Northern Ireland.	EirGrid	7.3 GW (2022)	29.6 TWh	2020
SIEPAC	Panama Costa Rica Honduras Nicaragua El Salvador Guatemala	The Central American Electrical Interconnection System serves Costa Rica, El Salvador, Guatemala, Honduras, Nicaragua and Panama		6.7 GW		2020
Khatulistiwa System	Malaysia Indonesia	Sarawak state and the northwestern part of West Kalimantan (Part of ASEAN Power Grid project)	Heads of ASEAN Power Utilities/Authorities (HAPUA)	5.5 GW		2017
South West Interconnected System	Australia	Western Australia		4.3 GW	17.3 TWh	2016
GCC Interconnection	United Arab Emirates Bahrain Saudi Arabia Oman Qatar Kuwait		Gulf Cooperation Council Interconnection Authority			

Historically, on the North American power transmission grid the Eastern and Western Interconnections were directly connected, and was at the time largest synchronous grid in the world, but this was found to be unstable, and they are now only DC interconnected.

== Planned ==
=== Planned grid ===
- Unified Smart Grid unification of the US interconnections into a single grid with smart grid features.
- SuperSmart Grid a similar mega grid proposal linking UCTE, IPS/UPS, and Mediterranean grid.
- ASEAN Power Grid plan to connect all ASEAN Grids. The first step is connecting all mainland ASEAN countries with Sumatra, Java, and Singapore Grid, then Borneo Island and Philippines.
- Eight Country Interconnection Project (EIJLLPST, Egypt, Iraq, Jordan, Libya, Lebanon, Palestine, Syria, and Turkey).
- Maghreb Countries Interconnection Project

=== DC interconnectors ===
Existing links Under construction Proposed Many of these HVDC lines transfer power from renewable sources such as hydro and wind. For names, see also the annotated version.

Interconnectors such as High-voltage direct current lines, solid-state transformers or variable-frequency transformers can be used to connect two alternating current interconnection networks which are not necessarily synchronized with each other. This provides the benefit of interconnection without the need to synchronize an even wider area. For example, compare the wide area synchronous grid map of Europe (in the introduction) with the map of HVDC lines (here to the right). Solid state transformers have larger losses than conventional transformers, but DC lines lack reactive impedance and overall HVDC lines have lower losses sending power over long distances within a synchronous grid, or between them.

== Planned non-synchronous connections ==
The Tres Amigas SuperStation aims to enable energy transfers and trading between the Eastern Interconnection and Western Interconnection using 30GW HVDC Interconnectors.

== See also ==
- High-voltage direct current (HVDC)
- Super grid
- European super grid
- Microgrid
- Smart grid
- Unified Smart Grid
- SuperSmart Grid
- Tres Amigas SuperStation
