= Bùi Văn Tự =

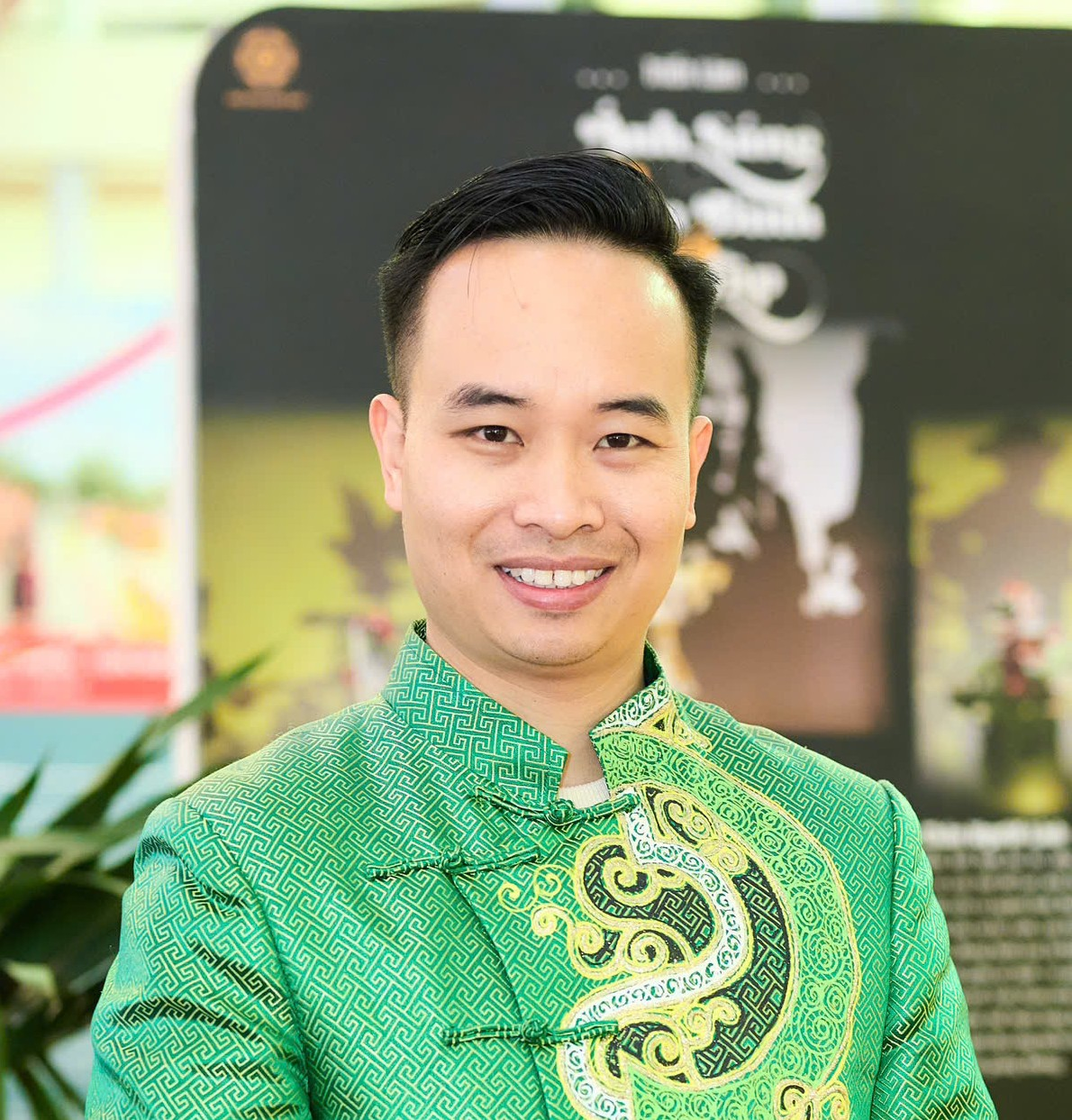
- Bùi Văn Tự in 2024
- Born: Bùi Văn Tự; October 31, 1992 (age 33); Gia Lâm Commune, Nho Quan, Ninh Bình
- Occupation: Light sculpture artisan
- Known for: The first person in Vietnam to pioneer light sculpture art.; Semifinalist on Vietnam's Got Talent 2014.
- Notable work: Great Russia

Bùi Văn Tự (born October 31, 1992) is a Vietnamese artist and light sculptor. He is the first person in Vietnam to create light sculpture art.

The light sculpture titled "Great Russia" created by Bùi Văn Tự was gifted by the President of Vietnam Tô Lâm, on behalf of General Secretary Nguyễn Phú Trọng, to President Vladimir Putin during Vladimir Putin's 2024 Vietnam visit.

== Biography ==
Bùi Văn Tự was born in 1992 in Gia Lâm Commune, Nho Quan District, Ninh Bình Province. During his time as a university student, while installing a lighting system for a miniature landscape, he noticed that the shadow of the landscape on the wall resembled a bear. This serendipitous event inspired Bùi Văn Tự to embark on the journey of researching and creating a new art form called light sculpture art, a new artistic movement in Vietnam.

In 2014, Bùi Văn Tự introduced light sculpture art to the public through the program Vietnam's Got Talent. Judge Hoài Linh pressed the "golden buzzer," sending him straight to the semifinals.

In 2022, Bùi Văn Tự unveiled his first public exhibition, "The Light of Knowledge," showcasing portraits of famous figures such as Albert Einstein, Nikola Tesla, and Leonardo da Vinci.

In April 2024, Anh introduced a light sculpture art exhibition themed Chronicle Journey Through Time in Ninh Bình, featuring nearly 100 light sculptures that recreate the stages of human development—from the discovery of fire to the agricultural era and the scientific and technological revolution. A month later, in May 2024, on the occasion of the 70th anniversary of the Điện Biên Phủ victory, Bùi Văn Tự unveiled the exceptional art collection Legend of Điện Biên. This masterpiece was displayed at the exhibition Travel Through Vietnam's Heritage and Scenic Destinations. Also in May, his light sculpture art recounting Vietnam's history was showcased at the exhibition Lighting Up the Chronicle at the Center for Vietnamese Craftsmanship Excellence in Bát Tràng, Hanoi.

On June 20, 2024, following a meeting between Russian President Vladimir Putin and the leaders of the Vietnam-Russia Friendship Association along with Vietnamese alumni in Russia at the Hanoi Opera House, State President Tô Lâm presented Putin with the sculpture Great Russia on behalf of General Secretary Nguyễn Phú Trọng. The piece, carved from birch wood—a symbol of Russian culture—was created by Bùi Văn Tự. It depicts a majestic horse beneath a birch forest canopy, symbolizing strength, resilience, and freedom. When illuminated, the shadows cast by the tree create the image of a young Putin, embodying his aspiration to build a great Russia.

In July 2024, to commemorate War Invalids and Martyrs Day, Bùi Văn Tự unveiled a unique collection of light sculptures titled Footprints of Soldiers – Aspiration for Peace.
