= Interconnector =

Structure enabling energy to flow between networks

An interconnector (also known as a DC tie in the USA) is a structure which enables high-voltage DC electricity to flow between electrical grids, connecting separate AC networks, or linking synchronous grids. It may be formed of submarine power cables, underground power cables or overhead power lines.

The longest interconnection as of July 2022 was the 2,210 km (1,370 mi) Hami - Zhengzhou delivering 8 GW of high voltage direct current power. The longest proposed connector is the 3,800 km (2,400 mi), 3.6 GW Xlinks Morocco-UK Power Project.

== Economy ==
Interconnectors allow the trading of electricity between territories. For example, the East–West Interconnector allows the trading of electricity between Great Britain and Ireland. A territory which generates more energy than it requires for its own activities can therefore sell surplus energy to a neighbouring territory.

Interconnectors also provide increased resilience. Within the European Union there is a movement towards a single market for energy, which makes interconnectors viable. They are essential to achieve security of supply. As such, the Nordic and Baltic energy exchange Nord Pool Spot rely on multiple interconnectors. The fullest possible implementation of this is the proposed European super grid which would include numerous interconnectors between national networks.

Interconnectors are used to increase the security of the energy supply and to manage peak demand. They enable cross-border access to the producers and consumers of electricity, thus increasing the competition in energy markets. They also help integrate more electricity generated from renewable sources, thus reducing the use of fossil fuel power plants and CO_{2} emissions. Interconnectors aid adaptation to changing demand patterns such as the uptake of electric vehicles.

In many parts of the world, there is a lack of interconnectors and building more of them could enable more efficient regionally integrated electricity systems with a greater share of renewable energy. One example of a region that could benefit from this is ASEAN.

== Infrastructure ==
Existing links Under construction Proposed Many of these HVDC lines transfer power from renewable sources such as hydro and wind. For names, see also the annotated version.

Interconnectors may run across a land border or connect two land areas separated by water. As of July 2022 there are at least 35 international connectors and many more intra-national connectors, see high-voltage direct-current (HVDC) projects.

== See also ==
- List of high-voltage direct-current (HVDC) projects
- Variable-frequency transformer
- Solid-state transformer
