= HVDC Thailand–Malaysia =

Transmission line connecting Malaysia and Thailand

The HVDC Thailand–Malaysia is a 110 kilometer long HVDC powerline between Khlong Ngae in Thailand at 6°42′56″N 100°27′08″E and Gurun in Malaysia. The HVDC Thailand–Malaysia, which crosses the border between Malaysia and Thailand at 6°31′47″N 100°24′11″E, serves for the coupling of the asynchronously operated power grids of Thailand and Malaysia and went in service in June 2002. The HVDC connection Thailand–Malaysia is a monopolar 300 kV overhead line with a maximum transmission rate of 300 megawatts. The terminal of the HVDC is situated east of Gurun at 5°48′45″N 100°32′06″E. The inverter hall is designed as Chinese style building.

The connection is being integrated into the wider ASEAN Power Grid project, to better create a regional electricity market in Southeast Asia for members of ASEAN.
