= JAMALI =

Synchronous grid in Indonesia

The JAMALI (short for Java–Madura–Bali) is a synchronous grid or interconnection that serve three islands (Java, Madura, and Bali) with almost 160 million peoples in Indonesia. The JAMALI covers three islands (Java, Madura, and Bali) in Indonesia. It covers several provinces, those are Jakarta, Banten, West Java, Central Java, Yogyakarta, East Java, and Bali. The JAMALI was established in the early 1980s.

== System operation ==
The JAMALI is managed for electricity market and balancing supply and demand by Unit Induk Pusat Pengatur Beban Jawa, Madura, dan Bali (UIP2B Jamali) of Perusahaan Listrik Negara since 2015. It is managed through 5 region control centers (RCCs) (Unit Pelaksana Pengatur Beban, UP2B).

Regional Control Center (RCC)
Region Control Center (RCC)	Area	HQ Location
DKI Jakarta & Banten	Jakarta; Banten	Cawang, East Jakarta
West Java	West Java	Cigereleng, Bandung
Central Java	Central Java; Yogyakarta	Ungaran, Semarang
East Java	East Java	Waru, Taman, Sidoarjo
Bali	Bali	Mengwi, Badung

== Transmission ==
The JAMALI for transmission grid is managed by three transmission units (Unit Induk Transmisi) of Perusahaan Listrik Negara since 2015.

Transmission unit
Transmission unit	Area	HQ Location
West Java	Jakarta; Banten	Cinere
Central Java	West Java; Central Java; Yogyakarta	Cigereleng, Bandung
East Java and Bali	East Java; Bali	Waru, Taman, Sidoarjo

Transmission
	2024	
	Lines (kM)	Transformator (MVA)
References		
66kV	2996.44	3,261
150kV	16,102.34	66,951
275kV	0	0
500kV	6,833.73	42,850

=== 500kV Java–Bali transmission project ===
As Bali subsystem is supplied by limited several power plants while the demand increases, Perusahaan Listrik Negara constructs the 500kV Java–Bali powerline to supply Bali from Java.

== Generation ==
The JAMALI is supplied by coal thermal power plants (60,2%), gas thermal power plants (30,5%), renewable power plants (8,4%), and others (0,9%). The JAMALI covers about 79% Indonesian power generation.

== Distribution ==
The JAMALI supplies 6 distribution units of Perusahaan Listrik Negara across Java, Madura, and Bali. This contributes to 60% of Indonesian electricity load.

Distribution Units
Distribution Units	Area	HQ Location
Greater Jakarta	Jakarta	Gambir, Jakarta
West Java	West Java	Bandung
Central Java and Special Region of Yogyakarta	Central Java Yogyakarta	Semarang
East Java	East Java	Surabaya
Banten	Banten	Serang
Bali	Bali	Denpasar

== Major disruptions ==
=== 1997 Java–Bali blackout ===
The 1997 Java–Bali blackout was a power outage across Java and Bali on April 13, 1997 10.15–13.15 UTC+7 and 17–20 UTC+7 due to trip on 500 kV Suralaya which equals to 1250 MW (25% of generation supply).

=== 2005 Java–Bali blackout ===
The 2005 Java–Bali blackout was a power outage across Java and Bali on 18 August 2005 around 10:23 am (UTC+7). A transmission line between Cilegon and Saguling, both in West Java, failed at 10:23 am (UTC+7). The devices protecting the system misoperated, sending incorrect signals to Suralaya Power Station. This led to a cascading failure that shut down two units of the Paiton Power Station in East Java and six units at Suralaya in West Java.

=== 2009 Bali blackout ===
The 2009 Bali blackout was a power outage that occurred across much of Bali on September 16, 2009 due to failure on 200 MW undersea cable from Java.

=== 2015 Bali blackout ===
The 2015 Bali blackout was a power outage that occurred across much of Bali from February 21 – March 1, 2015 due to scheduled maintenance of Gilimanuk gas thermal power plant.

=== 2018 Java blackout ===
The 2018 Java blackout was a power outage that occurred across much of Java from September 5 – due to failure on 500 kV transmission Paiton–Grati, Paiton–Kediri and Kediri–Pedan.

=== 2019 Java blackout ===
The 2019 Java blackout was a power outage that occurred across much of Java from August 4, 2019, 11:50 (UTC+7) to August 5, 2019, at 22:00 (UTC+7) (depending on area) because of a disturbance on the transmission side of Ungaran–Pemalang 500 kV which resulted in energy transfers from east to west failing. This caused half of the Java into blackout.

=== 2025 Bali blackout ===
The 2025 Bali blackout was a power outage that occurred across Bali from May 3, 2025 04:00 pm (UTC+7) to May 5, 2025 03:30 pm (UTC+8) due to Unit 2 Celukan Bawang coal thermal power plant maintenance and failure on undersea cable from Java.

=== 2026 Java blackout ===
The 2026 Java blackout was a rolling power outage that occurred across Java from June 8 to June 19, 2026 (UTC+7). The grid had several power outages due to insufficient supply of coals for coal thermal power plants in Java.
