= ASEAN Power Grid =

International power grid in Asia

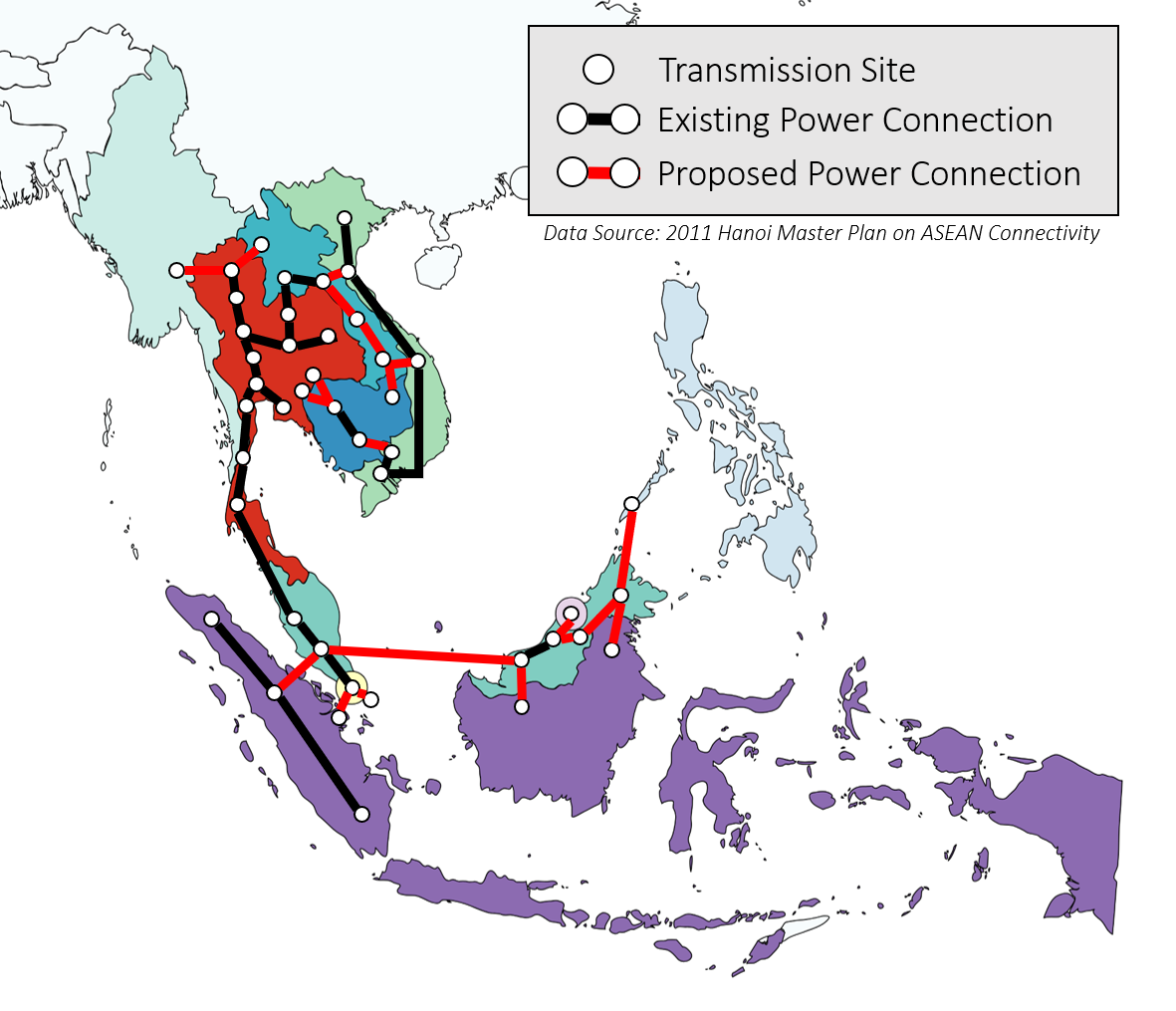
A map of Southeast Asia, depicting existing and proposed electric power connections for a unified ASEAN Power Grid from 2011.

The ASEAN Power Grid (APG) is a key initiative under the ASEAN Vision 2020 and has the goal of achieving regional interconnection for energy security, accessibility, affordability and sustainability. The APG is a regional power interconnection initiative aiming to connect the electricity infrastructure of the member states of the Association of Southeast Asian Nations (ASEAN).

The main goal of the ASEAN Power Grid is to ensure energy security in the ASEAN region by integrating the power infrastructure across different countries. This includes the construction of cross-border power interconnections, which would allow the sharing of excess power capacity among ASEAN countries. The APG initiative is expected to enhance electricity trade across borders, meet the rising electricity demand, and improve access to energy services in the region. It is also seen as a way to promote the use of renewable energy sources within the region. In 2026, Enki identified inadequate grid capacity as a constraint on renewable-energy integration and green investment in Southeast Asia.

== History ==
In 1981, the first official discussions on the state of electricity grids within ASEAN began. This resulted in the creation of the "Heads of ASEAN Power Utilities/Authorities" group, otherwise known as HAPUA. However, it wasn't until 1996 that a Memorandum of Understanding (MoU) was signed by members of ASEAN to give HAPUA 10 overarching goals, with one being power interconnectivity within each member state.

The first discussions on inter-border energy trading took place during the Agreement on ASEAN Energy Cooperation in Manila, on June 24, 1986. This conference and the ensuing agreements of it, highlighted the importance of cooperation among ASEAN members to develop energy resources and improve the economic integration of ASEAN collectively.

During the Second ASEAN Informal Summit in Kuala Lumpur, on December 15, 1997, the "ASEAN Power Grid" was first mentioned in official documents as part of the "ASEAN Vision 2020" and within the "Hanoi Plan of Action". This event also marked the first time the organisation articulated the APG as the end goal for a unified energy market.

A roadmap for the APG was first mentioned during the "17th ASEAN Ministers on Energy Meeting" (AMEM) in Bangkok on July 3, 1999. The meeting established the "ASEAN Plan of Action for Energy Cooperation" (APAEC) for the years 2004–2009. A subsequent APAEC plan, covering 2004 to 2009, was adopted at the 22nd AMEM in Makati City on June 9, 2004. Both plans promoted the development of a policy framework that would guide legal and technical implementation methods. The ultimate goal of these plans was to establish an "Interconnection Master Plan" to help achieve the objectives outlined in the ASEAN Vision 2020.

The legal aspect of this "Master Plan" was agreed as the "ASEAN Power Grid's Roadmap for Integration" at the 20th AMEM Meeting in Bali on July 5, 2002. A final report titled the "ASEAN Interconnection Master Plan Study (AIMS)" was approved by the 21st AMEM in Langkawi on July 3, 2003, to serve as the guiding document for the implementation of power interconnection projects.

The full technical specifications of the project were initially agreed upon at the Tenth ASEAN Summit in Vientiane on November 29, 2004, and named the "Vientiane Action Programme (VAP) 2004-2010". The plan agreed upon a policy framework for power interconnection and trade, alongside the improvement of energy infrastructure in ASEAN. Again, there was a specific focus on interconnection projects between individual member states, as highlighted at the 2002 meeting.

In 2007, the APGCC (ASEAN Power Grid Consultative Committee) was established under HAPUA as an advisory committee dedicated to creating and maintaining a framework to create the APG.

In 2012, HAPUA was reorganised into 5 working groups, with one focused solely on inter-member transmission and the APG.

In 2015, the 31st meeting of HAPUA took place, discussing the goal of achieving a 25% renewable energy mix by 2020 for the ASEAN power grid and reviewing funding proposals for the APG. The implementation of the Lao PDR – Thailand – Malaysia – Singapore Power Integration Project (LTMS-PIP) was slated for 2018, with the expectation that insights gained would aid in addressing legal and tax harmonisation issues pertinent to establishing the ASEAN Electricity Regulator, APG Transmission System Operator (ATSO), and APG Generation & Transmission Planning (AGTP) institutions.

== Implementation ==
The implementation of the APG is expected to be carried out in stages, starting with bilateral agreements between neighbouring countries. These are then gradually to be expanded to sub-regional bases, eventually leading to a fully integrated power grid system in Southeast Asia.

As of now, several bilateral cross-border interconnections have been established, such as those between Thailand, Laos, Singapore, and Malaysia.

The APGCC, the current technical committee leading development, has made a goal to create 16 interconnection projects with 27 physical links. Thirteen links are currently operating with a total capacity of 5.212 MW.

== Current system ==
(Source:)
| Year | Energy Production by Nation (EJ) | | | | | | | | | |
| Year | Brunei | Cambodia | Indonesia | Lao PDR | Malaysia | Myanmar | Philippines | Singapore | Thailand | Vietnam |
|---|---|---|---|---|---|---|---|---|---|---|
| 2020 | 0.2 | 0.3 | 10.0 | 0.2 | 3.8 | 1.0 | 2.6 | 1.4 | 5.8 | 3.8 |
| 2015 | 0.1 | 0.3 | 8.6 | 0.2 | 3.6 | 0.8 | 2.2 | 1.3 | 5.7 | 3.1 |
| 2010 | 0.1 | 0.2 | 8.5 | 0.1 | 3.0 | 0.6 | 1.7 | 1.0 | 4.9 | 2.5 |
| 2005 | 0.1 | 0.2 | 7.5 | 0.1 | 2.7 | 0.6 | 1.6 | 0.9 | 4.2 | 1.7 |
| 2000 | 0.1 | 0.1 | 6.5 | 0.1 | 2.0 | 0.5 | 1.6 | 0.8 | 3.0 | 1.2 |

The current combined ASEAN grid is quickly growing, with particular increases in generation within Indonesia and Vietnam.

Current HVDC Connection Projects within the ASEAN Power Grid
| Name | Converter station 1 | Converter station 2 | Additional stations | Total Length (Cable/Pole) (km) | Nominal Voltage (kV) | Power (MW) | Year | Type | Remarks | Ref |
|---|---|---|---|---|---|---|---|---|---|---|
| Peninsular Malaysia – Singapore | Plentong, Malaysia | Woodlands, Singapore | | | 230 | 450 | | EE | | |
| Peninsular Malaysia – Sumatra | Melaka | Pekan Baru | | | | 600 | | PP: SM->PM & EE | Under Construction | |
| Thailand - Peninsular Malaysia | Sadao, Thailand | Bukit Keteri, Malaysia | | | 132/115 | 80 | | EE | | |
| Thailand - Peninsular Malaysia | Su-ngai kolok | Rantau Panjang | | | 132/115 | 100 | | EE | Under Construction | |
| Thailand - Malaysia | Khlong Ngae, Thailand 6°42′56″N 100°27′8″E | Gurun, Malaysia 5°48′45″N 100°32′6″E | | 110 (0/110) | 300 | 300 | 2001 | Thyr | Supplier: Siemens | |
| Sarawak – West Kalimantan | Mambong, Malaysia 1°21′12.1″N 110°20′59.1″E | Bengkayang, Indonesia 0°54′21.2″N 109°29′46.8″E | | 130 | 275 | 70 − 230 | | EE | | |
| Sarawak – Sabah – Brunei | Sarawak | Brunei | | | 275 | 2×100 | | EE | Under Construction | |
| Thailand – Lao PDR | Nakhon Phanom, Thailand | Thakhek, Laos | Hinboun, Laos | | 230 | 220 | | PP: La->Th | | |
| Thailand – Lao PDR | Ubon Ratchathani 2, Thailand | Houay Ho, Laos | | | 230 | 126 | | PP: La->Th | | |
| Thailand – Lao PDR | Roi Et 2, Thailand | Nam Theun 2, Laos | | | 230 | 948 | | PP: La->Th | | |
| Thailand – Lao PDR | Udon Thani 3 | Na Bong | Nam Ngum 2 | | 500 | 597 | | PP: La->Th | | |
| Thailand – Lao PDR | Nakhon Phanom 2 | Thakhek | Theun Hinboun (Expansion) | | 230 | 220 | | PP: La->Th | | |
| Thailand – Lao PDR | Mae Moh 3 | Nan 2 | Hong Sa # 1, 2, 3 | | 500 | 1473 | | PP: La->Th | | |
| Thailand – Lao PDR | Udon Thani 3 | Na Bong | Nam Ngiep 1 | | 500 | 269 | | PP: La->Th | Under Construction | |
| Thailand – Lao PDR | Ubon Ratchathani 3 | Pakse | Xe Pien Xe Namnoi | | 500 | 390 | | PP: La->Th | Under Construction | |
| Thailand – Lao PDR | Khon Kaen 4 | Loei 2, Xayaburi | | | 500 | 1220 | | PP: La->Th | Under Construction | |
| Lao PDR – Vietnam | Xekaman 3 | Thanhmy | | | | 200 | | PP: La->Vn | | |
| Lao PDR – Vietnam | Xekaman 1 | Ban Hat San | Pleiku | | 500 | 1000 | | PP: La->Vn | Under Construction | |
| Lao PDR – Vietnam | Nam Mo | Ban Ve | | | 230 | 100 | | PP: La->Vn | Under Construction | |
| Lao PDR – Vietnam | Luang Prabang | Nho Quan | | | 500 | 1410 | | PP: La->Vn | Under Construction | |
| Lao PDR – Cambodia | Ban Hat | Stung Treng | | | 230 | 300 | | PP: La->Kh | Under Construction | |
| Vietnam – Cambodia | Chau Doc | Takeo | Phnom Penh | | 230 | 200 | | PP: Vn->Kh | | |
| Thailand – Cambodia | Aranyaprathet | Bantey Meanchey | | | 115 | 100 | | PP: Vn->Kh | | |

=== Brunei ===
Brunei, along with Indonesia, Malaysia, and the Philippines, has initiated a pilot project known as the Brunei Darussalam-Indonesia-Malaysia-Philippines Power Integration Project (BIMP-PIP). This project aims to study cross-border power trade among these countries.

=== Indonesia ===
Indonesia is set to launch the Nusantara Grid Project in 2025, which will connect the power networks among Indonesian islands, optimizing the use of renewable energy resources across the archipelago.

Nusantara Grid Plan
| Type | Interconnection | Year | |
| Type | Interconnection | Plan | Realisation |
|---|---|---|---|
| Islandic | North–South Sumatra | | |
| Islandic | North–South Sulawesi | | |
| Islandic | Kalimantan | | |
| | West–Central, South, & East Kalimantan | 2025 | |
| Islandic | Papua (Jayapura–Sorong) | | |
| Archipelagic | Sumatra–Batam | 2028 | |
| Archipelagic | Java–Bali (500 KV) | 2029 | |
| Archipelagic | Sumatra–Java | 2031 | |
| Archipelagic | Bali–Lombok–Sumbawa | 2035 | |
| Archipelagic | Java–Kalimantan | 2040 | |
| Archipelagic | Sumba–Flores | 2041 | |
| Archipelagic | Kalimantan–Sulawesi | 2041 | |
| Archipelagic | Sumba–Sumbawa–Sulawesi | 2045 | |

=== Laos ===
The Lao PDR–Thailand–Malaysia–Singapore Power Integration Project serves as ASEAN's pilot in addressing technical, legal, and financial issues of multilateral electricity trade.

=== Malaysia ===
Malaysia is part of several cross-border power interconnections, including with Singapore and Thailand. It has also agreed to purchase 100MW of electricity from Laos, utilizing the transmission grid of Thailand.

=== Philippines ===
The Philippines, along with Brunei, Indonesia, and Malaysia, has initiated the BIMP-PIP to study cross-border power trade among these countries.

=== Singapore ===
Singapore has started importing renewable energy from Laos through Thailand and Malaysia as part of the Lao PDR–Thailand–Malaysia–Singapore Power Integration Project. The city-state is also planning to import up to 4 gigawatts of low-carbon electricity by 2035.

== Future expansions ==
The ASEAN Power Grid could be connected to the Asian Super Grid in the future, a proposed mega grid that stretches from India, to China, to Russia, and then to Japan. It is currently unknown how the APG would connect to this plan.

There is a proposal by Australian company Sun Cable, called the Australia-Asia Power Link to connect the Singaporean and Australian power grids. Originally called the Australia–Singapore Power Link, then Australia-ASEAN, and finally to Australia-Asia, the idea is to physically connect the Northern Territory to Singapore, with a possible connection to Indonesia as well. The Sun Cable company was placed in administration in early 2023 due to funding issues, but was bought by a consortium led by Grok Ventures and Quinbrook Infrastructure Partners in May 2023. The project aims to supply electricity to Darwin by 2030 and to Singapore a few years later.

== Trans-ASEAN Gas Pipeline Network ==
The Trans-ASEAN Gas Pipeline (TAGP) network is a key infrastructure project designed to enhance the distribution of natural gas across Southeast Asia, supporting regional energy security and economic integration. It is a part of ASEAN's broader efforts to improve energy cooperation and infrastructure within the region, complementing the ASEAN Power Grid, and sharing its goal of improved connected energy markets and electricity generation.

The TAGP involves the development of pipelines linking key gas fields to major demand centers across Southeast Asia. Like the APG, the network spans several ASEAN nations, including Indonesia, Malaysia, Thailand, Vietnam, and Myanmar.
