= Light sculpture art =

Vietnamese art form

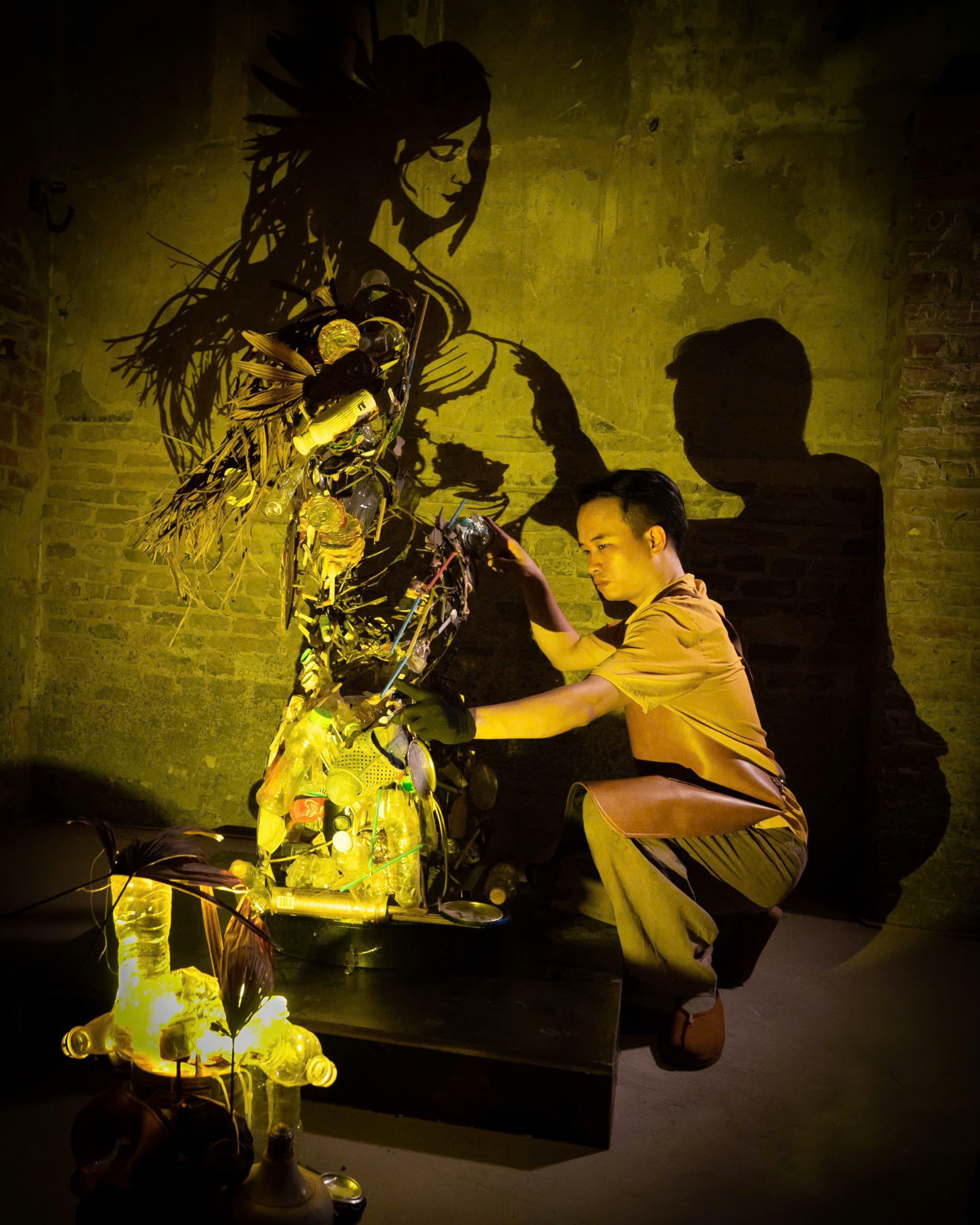
Light Sculpture Art by Bùi Văn Tự

Light sculpture art is an art form in Vietnam, combining traditional sculpture techniques with the creation of forms using fixed light. Light sculpture artworks are created through the interaction between sculpted objects and light sources. Bùi Văn Tự is the first person in Vietnam to showcase this art form.

Light sculpture art was chosen by General Secretary Nguyễn Phú Trọng to be presented to Vladimir Putin during his visit to Vietnam in 2024.

== History ==
During one occasion when setting up and decorating a miniature landscape, while installing lights to highlight the scene, Bùi Văn Tự noticed that the shadow of the landscape on the wall resembled a bear. Following this observation, he began combining sculpted objects with directional lighting to project specific shadow images. Because the medium relies on both physical form and cast shadow, artists use it to depict cultural, historical, and biographical subjects.

Bùi Văn Tự spent 10 years exploring and pioneering a new artistic path. He named the art form he pursued "light sculpture art". In 2014, Bùi Văn Tự introduced light sculpture art on the program Vietnam's Got Talent. Hoài Linh pressed the "golden buzzer," sending him straight to the finals. In 2022, Bùi Văn Tự publicly debuted the exhibition "Light of Knowledge" with portraits of famous figures such as Albert Einstein, Nikola Tesla, and Leonardo da Vinci.

Light sculpture art showcasing the history of Vietnam by artist Bùi Văn Tự was displayed at the "Lighting the Historical Path" exhibition in 2024 at the Center of Vietnamese Craftsmanship in Bát Tràng, Hanoi. Using rough wooden blocks combined with illuminating light, artist Bùi Văn Tự created works depicting 14 exemplary heroes of the Vietnamese nation. Each piece illustrates a historical period of the nation's struggle for independence and preservation.

In April 2024, the light sculpture art exhibition titled "Journey Through Time" appeared in Ninh Bình. Nearly 100 light sculptures depicted various stages of human development, from the discovery of fire to the agricultural era and then to the scientific and technological revolution.

== Reception ==
During the visit of the Russian president to Vietnam in 2024, on behalf of Nguyễn Phú Trọng, Vietnamese President Tô Lâm presented President Vladimir Putin with a light sculpture titled "Great Russia". The artwork is carved from birch wood, a tree that symbolizes Russian cultural identity. The piece "Great Russia" depicts a horse under a birch forest canopy. Light shining through the trees forms an image of a young Putin, symbolizing his aspiration to build a powerful Russia.

== See also ==
- Sculpture
- Bùi Văn Tự
