= Voltage reduction =

In a simple resistive circuit, voltage reduction is where a reduction in the voltage across the resistance will result in a reduction in the power dissipated by the circuit. In electric utilities, voltage reduction takes place through tap changing transformers and distribution voltage regulators.

== Electric utilities ==
Electric utilities have discovered that this basic principle can save utility companies, and their customers, a significant amount of money. Utilities are able to shave the peak of their power demand curves by reducing the voltage across their distribution system. When a utility reaches a point where power demand is expected to exceed supply, utilities only have two options. Either purchase power from another utility, usually at substantial prices, or reduce demand. Often utilities use load management systems to turn off customers' air conditioners, water heaters, and pool pumps to reduce demand. Voltage reduction has become another option for utilities to reduce demand—typically unbeknownst to the customer. However, only the resistive portion of the load responds to the reduction in voltage to reduce aggregate demand. Loads such as incandescent lights and heater coils will use less power as the voltage is lowered. On the other hand, induction motor loads are unaffected by the reduction in voltage, because the current simply rises to account for no change or even a slight increase in power consumption. Current rise is detrimental to motors, since they run hotter. Also, to accomplish the same work the motors have to run longer, for example, if a refrigerator is running at 35% duty cycle at nominal voltage, at lower voltage its duty cycle may increase to 40%. Running hotter and running longer shortens the service longevity of motors.

Even some resistive loads provide only short-term benefits. A phenomenon known as load diversity plays a role in voltage reduction and can counteract its effects on occasion. The concept of load diversity can most easily be explained with an example. In your neighborhood, it is unlikely that all of the homes' water heaters are on at the same time. Particularly during non-hot water usage hours (morning and evening showers), when your hot water heater is on, your neighbor's may be off. Due to the distributed and noncoincident nature of these loads, the aggregate peak can remain relatively constant. However, if the voltage is reduced to all of the resistive elements in the water heaters, the elements will not be able to heat the water as quickly. While an immediate reduction in the power demand will be recognized upon initiating voltage reduction, over time water heaters will need to be on longer to achieve the thermostat-set water temperature. Thus, more water heaters will be on at the same time. This will cause the aggregate peak to increase substantially. Therefore, with respect to thermostat-controlled resistive loads, the benefits of voltage reduction can be short lived, and may occasionally end up increasing the aggregate load demand.

Conversely increasing the voltage may increase power demand from the resistive loads. Again, the thermostat-controlled resistive loads will react differently, but it is clear that it will cost a customer more to turn on that incandescent reading lamp with higher voltage than it would at a lower voltage. Many light fixtures, including the ones with LED type bulbs, are dimmable. Therefore at lower voltage the dimmer will be turned up and at higher voltage it will be turned down, resulting in the same lumens being generated by the light fixture, hence no energy savings will take place.
