= Solid-state transformer =

Electric power converter

A solid-state transformer (SST), power electronic transformer (PET), or electronic power transformer is an AC-to-AC converter, a type of electric power converter that replaces a conventional transformer used in AC electric power distribution. It is more complex than a conventional transformer operating at utility frequency, but can be smaller and more efficient than conventional transformers because it operates at higher frequencies. Solid-state transformers are an emerging technology as of 2025.

Solid-state transformers can actively regulate voltage and current. Some can convert single-phase power to three-phase power and vice versa. Variations can input or output DC power to reduce the number of conversions, for greater end-to-end efficiency. As a complex electronic circuit, it must be designed to withstand lightning and other surges.

The main types are true AC-to-AC converter (with no DC stages) and AC-to-DC-to-DC-to-AC converter (in which an active rectifier supplies power to a DC-to-DC converter, which supplies power to a power inverter). A solid-state transformer usually contains a transformer, inside the AC-to-AC converter or DC-to-DC converter, which provides electrical isolation and carries the full power. This transformer is smaller due to smaller DC-DC inverting stages between transformer coils, which consequently mean smaller transformer coils required to step up or step down voltages.

A modular solid-state transformer consists of several high-frequency transformers and is similar to a multi-level converter.
