= Nho Quan =

Nho Quan Xã Nho Quan
- Commune
- Nho Quan commune
- Location within Vietnam
- Coordinates: 20°19′22″N 105°44′57″E
- Country: Vietnam
- Region: Red River Delta
- Province: Ninh Bình
- Time zone: UTC+7 (UTC + 7)

Nho Quan is a commune (xã) of Ninh Bình province, Vietnam.
